

381001–381100 

|-bgcolor=#fefefe
| 381001 ||  || — || October 11, 2006 || Kitt Peak || Spacewatch || — || align=right data-sort-value="0.91" | 910 m || 
|-id=002 bgcolor=#fefefe
| 381002 ||  || — || October 12, 2006 || Palomar || NEAT || — || align=right | 1.0 km || 
|-id=003 bgcolor=#fefefe
| 381003 ||  || — || October 4, 2006 || Mount Lemmon || Mount Lemmon Survey || FLO || align=right data-sort-value="0.55" | 550 m || 
|-id=004 bgcolor=#fefefe
| 381004 ||  || — || October 15, 2006 || Lulin Observatory || C.-S. Lin, Q.-z. Ye || — || align=right data-sort-value="0.78" | 780 m || 
|-id=005 bgcolor=#fefefe
| 381005 ||  || — || October 3, 2006 || Mount Lemmon || Mount Lemmon Survey || — || align=right data-sort-value="0.72" | 720 m || 
|-id=006 bgcolor=#fefefe
| 381006 ||  || — || October 16, 2006 || Goodricke-Pigott || R. A. Tucker || — || align=right data-sort-value="0.79" | 790 m || 
|-id=007 bgcolor=#fefefe
| 381007 ||  || — || October 16, 2006 || Catalina || CSS || — || align=right data-sort-value="0.89" | 890 m || 
|-id=008 bgcolor=#fefefe
| 381008 ||  || — || September 30, 2006 || Mount Lemmon || Mount Lemmon Survey || — || align=right data-sort-value="0.78" | 780 m || 
|-id=009 bgcolor=#fefefe
| 381009 ||  || — || October 16, 2006 || Kitt Peak || Spacewatch || — || align=right data-sort-value="0.98" | 980 m || 
|-id=010 bgcolor=#fefefe
| 381010 ||  || — || September 26, 2006 || Kitt Peak || Spacewatch || — || align=right data-sort-value="0.78" | 780 m || 
|-id=011 bgcolor=#fefefe
| 381011 ||  || — || October 18, 2006 || Kitt Peak || Spacewatch || V || align=right data-sort-value="0.54" | 540 m || 
|-id=012 bgcolor=#fefefe
| 381012 ||  || — || October 18, 2006 || Kitt Peak || Spacewatch || — || align=right data-sort-value="0.66" | 660 m || 
|-id=013 bgcolor=#fefefe
| 381013 ||  || — || October 18, 2006 || Kitt Peak || Spacewatch || — || align=right data-sort-value="0.95" | 950 m || 
|-id=014 bgcolor=#fefefe
| 381014 ||  || — || October 19, 2006 || Kitt Peak || Spacewatch || — || align=right data-sort-value="0.74" | 740 m || 
|-id=015 bgcolor=#fefefe
| 381015 ||  || — || October 20, 2006 || Mount Lemmon || Mount Lemmon Survey || FLO || align=right data-sort-value="0.67" | 670 m || 
|-id=016 bgcolor=#fefefe
| 381016 ||  || — || October 2, 2006 || Mount Lemmon || Mount Lemmon Survey || FLO || align=right data-sort-value="0.65" | 650 m || 
|-id=017 bgcolor=#fefefe
| 381017 ||  || — || October 16, 2006 || Catalina || CSS || — || align=right data-sort-value="0.84" | 840 m || 
|-id=018 bgcolor=#fefefe
| 381018 ||  || — || September 28, 2006 || Catalina || CSS || FLO || align=right data-sort-value="0.59" | 590 m || 
|-id=019 bgcolor=#fefefe
| 381019 ||  || — || October 20, 2006 || Kitt Peak || Spacewatch || FLO || align=right data-sort-value="0.48" | 480 m || 
|-id=020 bgcolor=#fefefe
| 381020 ||  || — || October 19, 2006 || Catalina || CSS || FLO || align=right data-sort-value="0.53" | 530 m || 
|-id=021 bgcolor=#fefefe
| 381021 ||  || — || October 23, 2006 || Kitt Peak || Spacewatch || FLO || align=right data-sort-value="0.62" | 620 m || 
|-id=022 bgcolor=#fefefe
| 381022 ||  || — || October 23, 2006 || Kitt Peak || Spacewatch || — || align=right | 1.0 km || 
|-id=023 bgcolor=#fefefe
| 381023 ||  || — || October 19, 2006 || Catalina || CSS || FLO || align=right data-sort-value="0.85" | 850 m || 
|-id=024 bgcolor=#fefefe
| 381024 ||  || — || October 20, 2006 || Mount Lemmon || Mount Lemmon Survey || V || align=right data-sort-value="0.59" | 590 m || 
|-id=025 bgcolor=#fefefe
| 381025 ||  || — || October 20, 2006 || Palomar || NEAT || FLO || align=right data-sort-value="0.65" | 650 m || 
|-id=026 bgcolor=#fefefe
| 381026 ||  || — || October 22, 2006 || Kitt Peak || Spacewatch || — || align=right data-sort-value="0.79" | 790 m || 
|-id=027 bgcolor=#fefefe
| 381027 ||  || — || October 23, 2006 || Kitt Peak || Spacewatch || NYS || align=right data-sort-value="0.71" | 710 m || 
|-id=028 bgcolor=#fefefe
| 381028 ||  || — || October 28, 2006 || Mount Lemmon || Mount Lemmon Survey || FLO || align=right data-sort-value="0.60" | 600 m || 
|-id=029 bgcolor=#fefefe
| 381029 ||  || — || October 23, 2006 || Mount Lemmon || Mount Lemmon Survey || NYS || align=right data-sort-value="0.63" | 630 m || 
|-id=030 bgcolor=#fefefe
| 381030 ||  || — || November 10, 2006 || Kitt Peak || Spacewatch || — || align=right | 1.2 km || 
|-id=031 bgcolor=#fefefe
| 381031 ||  || — || October 3, 2006 || Mount Lemmon || Mount Lemmon Survey || — || align=right data-sort-value="0.73" | 730 m || 
|-id=032 bgcolor=#fefefe
| 381032 ||  || — || November 9, 2006 || Kitt Peak || Spacewatch || ERI || align=right | 1.5 km || 
|-id=033 bgcolor=#fefefe
| 381033 ||  || — || September 28, 2006 || Mount Lemmon || Mount Lemmon Survey || — || align=right data-sort-value="0.70" | 700 m || 
|-id=034 bgcolor=#d6d6d6
| 381034 ||  || — || November 11, 2006 || Kitt Peak || Spacewatch || 7:4 || align=right | 4.2 km || 
|-id=035 bgcolor=#fefefe
| 381035 ||  || — || November 11, 2006 || Kitt Peak || Spacewatch || — || align=right | 1.1 km || 
|-id=036 bgcolor=#fefefe
| 381036 ||  || — || November 11, 2006 || Kitt Peak || Spacewatch || — || align=right | 1.0 km || 
|-id=037 bgcolor=#fefefe
| 381037 ||  || — || November 13, 2006 || Kitt Peak || Spacewatch || — || align=right data-sort-value="0.94" | 940 m || 
|-id=038 bgcolor=#fefefe
| 381038 ||  || — || October 31, 2006 || Mount Lemmon || Mount Lemmon Survey || NYS || align=right data-sort-value="0.62" | 620 m || 
|-id=039 bgcolor=#fefefe
| 381039 ||  || — || November 13, 2006 || Kitt Peak || Spacewatch || — || align=right data-sort-value="0.64" | 640 m || 
|-id=040 bgcolor=#fefefe
| 381040 ||  || — || October 4, 2006 || Mount Lemmon || Mount Lemmon Survey || V || align=right data-sort-value="0.70" | 700 m || 
|-id=041 bgcolor=#fefefe
| 381041 ||  || — || October 23, 2006 || Kitt Peak || Spacewatch || — || align=right data-sort-value="0.47" | 470 m || 
|-id=042 bgcolor=#fefefe
| 381042 ||  || — || November 14, 2006 || Kitt Peak || Spacewatch || — || align=right data-sort-value="0.74" | 740 m || 
|-id=043 bgcolor=#fefefe
| 381043 ||  || — || November 14, 2006 || Mount Lemmon || Mount Lemmon Survey || — || align=right data-sort-value="0.60" | 600 m || 
|-id=044 bgcolor=#fefefe
| 381044 ||  || — || October 2, 2006 || Mount Lemmon || Mount Lemmon Survey || — || align=right data-sort-value="0.83" | 830 m || 
|-id=045 bgcolor=#fefefe
| 381045 ||  || — || November 15, 2006 || Mount Lemmon || Mount Lemmon Survey || — || align=right data-sort-value="0.87" | 870 m || 
|-id=046 bgcolor=#fefefe
| 381046 ||  || — || November 15, 2006 || Mount Lemmon || Mount Lemmon Survey || FLO || align=right data-sort-value="0.76" | 760 m || 
|-id=047 bgcolor=#fefefe
| 381047 ||  || — || November 9, 2006 || Palomar || NEAT || — || align=right data-sort-value="0.57" | 570 m || 
|-id=048 bgcolor=#fefefe
| 381048 Werber ||  ||  || November 17, 2006 || Nogales || J.-C. Merlin || — || align=right data-sort-value="0.73" | 730 m || 
|-id=049 bgcolor=#fefefe
| 381049 ||  || — || November 16, 2006 || Catalina || CSS || PHO || align=right data-sort-value="0.65" | 650 m || 
|-id=050 bgcolor=#d6d6d6
| 381050 ||  || — || November 20, 2006 || Catalina || CSS || Tj (2.43) || align=right | 3.9 km || 
|-id=051 bgcolor=#fefefe
| 381051 ||  || — || November 17, 2006 || Kitt Peak || Spacewatch || — || align=right data-sort-value="0.88" | 880 m || 
|-id=052 bgcolor=#fefefe
| 381052 ||  || — || November 17, 2006 || Mount Lemmon || Mount Lemmon Survey || PHO || align=right data-sort-value="0.97" | 970 m || 
|-id=053 bgcolor=#fefefe
| 381053 ||  || — || November 17, 2006 || Mount Lemmon || Mount Lemmon Survey || V || align=right data-sort-value="0.72" | 720 m || 
|-id=054 bgcolor=#fefefe
| 381054 ||  || — || November 16, 2006 || Kitt Peak || Spacewatch || — || align=right | 1.00 km || 
|-id=055 bgcolor=#fefefe
| 381055 ||  || — || November 21, 2006 || Mount Lemmon || Mount Lemmon Survey || — || align=right data-sort-value="0.79" | 790 m || 
|-id=056 bgcolor=#fefefe
| 381056 ||  || — || November 23, 2006 || Kitt Peak || Spacewatch || FLO || align=right data-sort-value="0.61" | 610 m || 
|-id=057 bgcolor=#fefefe
| 381057 ||  || — || November 24, 2006 || Mount Lemmon || Mount Lemmon Survey || — || align=right data-sort-value="0.72" | 720 m || 
|-id=058 bgcolor=#fefefe
| 381058 ||  || — || November 30, 2006 || Kitt Peak || Spacewatch || FLO || align=right data-sort-value="0.86" | 860 m || 
|-id=059 bgcolor=#fefefe
| 381059 ||  || — || November 26, 2006 || Kitt Peak || Spacewatch || V || align=right data-sort-value="0.63" | 630 m || 
|-id=060 bgcolor=#fefefe
| 381060 ||  || — || December 9, 2006 || Kitt Peak || Spacewatch || V || align=right data-sort-value="0.81" | 810 m || 
|-id=061 bgcolor=#fefefe
| 381061 ||  || — || December 10, 2006 || Kitt Peak || Spacewatch || — || align=right data-sort-value="0.98" | 980 m || 
|-id=062 bgcolor=#fefefe
| 381062 ||  || — || December 14, 2006 || Kitt Peak || Spacewatch || — || align=right data-sort-value="0.86" | 860 m || 
|-id=063 bgcolor=#d6d6d6
| 381063 ||  || — || December 14, 2006 || Kitt Peak || Spacewatch || 3:2 || align=right | 3.7 km || 
|-id=064 bgcolor=#fefefe
| 381064 ||  || — || November 21, 2006 || Mount Lemmon || Mount Lemmon Survey || V || align=right data-sort-value="0.74" | 740 m || 
|-id=065 bgcolor=#fefefe
| 381065 ||  || — || December 14, 2006 || Kitt Peak || Spacewatch || V || align=right data-sort-value="0.68" | 680 m || 
|-id=066 bgcolor=#fefefe
| 381066 ||  || — || December 16, 2006 || Kitt Peak || Spacewatch || — || align=right data-sort-value="0.96" | 960 m || 
|-id=067 bgcolor=#fefefe
| 381067 ||  || — || December 21, 2006 || Kitt Peak || Spacewatch || V || align=right data-sort-value="0.79" | 790 m || 
|-id=068 bgcolor=#fefefe
| 381068 ||  || — || December 13, 2006 || Kitt Peak || Spacewatch || — || align=right data-sort-value="0.78" | 780 m || 
|-id=069 bgcolor=#fefefe
| 381069 ||  || — || December 25, 2006 || Anderson Mesa || LONEOS || — || align=right | 1.0 km || 
|-id=070 bgcolor=#fefefe
| 381070 ||  || — || December 26, 2006 || 7300 Observatory || W. K. Y. Yeung || NYS || align=right data-sort-value="0.70" | 700 m || 
|-id=071 bgcolor=#fefefe
| 381071 ||  || — || December 26, 2006 || Kitt Peak || Spacewatch || FLO || align=right data-sort-value="0.76" | 760 m || 
|-id=072 bgcolor=#fefefe
| 381072 ||  || — || January 8, 2007 || Catalina || CSS || PHO || align=right | 1.2 km || 
|-id=073 bgcolor=#fefefe
| 381073 ||  || — || January 9, 2007 || Mount Lemmon || Mount Lemmon Survey || — || align=right | 1.1 km || 
|-id=074 bgcolor=#fefefe
| 381074 ||  || — || November 17, 2006 || Kitt Peak || Spacewatch || — || align=right | 1.1 km || 
|-id=075 bgcolor=#fefefe
| 381075 ||  || — || January 9, 2007 || Mount Lemmon || Mount Lemmon Survey || — || align=right data-sort-value="0.75" | 750 m || 
|-id=076 bgcolor=#fefefe
| 381076 ||  || — || January 10, 2007 || Mount Lemmon || Mount Lemmon Survey || NYS || align=right data-sort-value="0.71" | 710 m || 
|-id=077 bgcolor=#d6d6d6
| 381077 ||  || — || January 17, 2007 || Palomar || NEAT || HIL3:2 || align=right | 6.5 km || 
|-id=078 bgcolor=#fefefe
| 381078 ||  || — || January 23, 2007 || Anderson Mesa || LONEOS || — || align=right | 2.9 km || 
|-id=079 bgcolor=#fefefe
| 381079 ||  || — || January 8, 2007 || Kitt Peak || Spacewatch || — || align=right data-sort-value="0.94" | 940 m || 
|-id=080 bgcolor=#fefefe
| 381080 ||  || — || January 24, 2007 || Socorro || LINEAR || — || align=right | 1.1 km || 
|-id=081 bgcolor=#fefefe
| 381081 ||  || — || January 8, 2007 || Mount Lemmon || Mount Lemmon Survey || NYS || align=right data-sort-value="0.62" | 620 m || 
|-id=082 bgcolor=#fefefe
| 381082 ||  || — || January 24, 2007 || Catalina || CSS || MAS || align=right data-sort-value="0.63" | 630 m || 
|-id=083 bgcolor=#fefefe
| 381083 ||  || — || January 24, 2007 || Mount Lemmon || Mount Lemmon Survey || — || align=right data-sort-value="0.80" | 800 m || 
|-id=084 bgcolor=#fefefe
| 381084 ||  || — || January 9, 2007 || Mount Lemmon || Mount Lemmon Survey || MAS || align=right data-sort-value="0.70" | 700 m || 
|-id=085 bgcolor=#fefefe
| 381085 ||  || — || January 26, 2007 || Kitt Peak || Spacewatch || NYS || align=right data-sort-value="0.62" | 620 m || 
|-id=086 bgcolor=#fefefe
| 381086 ||  || — || January 24, 2007 || Socorro || LINEAR || V || align=right data-sort-value="0.80" | 800 m || 
|-id=087 bgcolor=#fefefe
| 381087 ||  || — || January 24, 2007 || Socorro || LINEAR || — || align=right data-sort-value="0.91" | 910 m || 
|-id=088 bgcolor=#fefefe
| 381088 ||  || — || December 21, 2006 || Kitt Peak || Spacewatch || — || align=right data-sort-value="0.75" | 750 m || 
|-id=089 bgcolor=#fefefe
| 381089 ||  || — || January 24, 2007 || Socorro || LINEAR || NYS || align=right data-sort-value="0.73" | 730 m || 
|-id=090 bgcolor=#fefefe
| 381090 ||  || — || January 27, 2007 || Mount Lemmon || Mount Lemmon Survey || — || align=right | 1.2 km || 
|-id=091 bgcolor=#fefefe
| 381091 ||  || — || January 27, 2007 || Mount Lemmon || Mount Lemmon Survey || — || align=right | 1.1 km || 
|-id=092 bgcolor=#fefefe
| 381092 ||  || — || January 17, 2007 || Kitt Peak || Spacewatch || V || align=right data-sort-value="0.78" | 780 m || 
|-id=093 bgcolor=#fefefe
| 381093 ||  || — || January 27, 2007 || Mount Lemmon || Mount Lemmon Survey || MAS || align=right data-sort-value="0.71" | 710 m || 
|-id=094 bgcolor=#fefefe
| 381094 ||  || — || January 27, 2007 || Mount Lemmon || Mount Lemmon Survey || MAS || align=right data-sort-value="0.76" | 760 m || 
|-id=095 bgcolor=#fefefe
| 381095 ||  || — || February 6, 2007 || Kitt Peak || Spacewatch || NYS || align=right data-sort-value="0.75" | 750 m || 
|-id=096 bgcolor=#fefefe
| 381096 ||  || — || November 27, 2006 || Mount Lemmon || Mount Lemmon Survey || — || align=right data-sort-value="0.97" | 970 m || 
|-id=097 bgcolor=#fefefe
| 381097 ||  || — || February 8, 2007 || Mount Lemmon || Mount Lemmon Survey || MAS || align=right data-sort-value="0.75" | 750 m || 
|-id=098 bgcolor=#fefefe
| 381098 ||  || — || February 6, 2007 || Mount Lemmon || Mount Lemmon Survey || — || align=right data-sort-value="0.91" | 910 m || 
|-id=099 bgcolor=#fefefe
| 381099 ||  || — || January 27, 2007 || Kitt Peak || Spacewatch || 417 || align=right data-sort-value="0.68" | 680 m || 
|-id=100 bgcolor=#fefefe
| 381100 ||  || — || December 15, 2006 || Kitt Peak || Spacewatch || V || align=right data-sort-value="0.56" | 560 m || 
|}

381101–381200 

|-bgcolor=#fefefe
| 381101 ||  || — || February 6, 2007 || Palomar || NEAT || ERI || align=right | 1.8 km || 
|-id=102 bgcolor=#fefefe
| 381102 ||  || — || February 8, 2007 || Kitt Peak || Spacewatch || V || align=right | 1.0 km || 
|-id=103 bgcolor=#fefefe
| 381103 ||  || — || February 10, 2007 || Mount Lemmon || Mount Lemmon Survey || — || align=right | 2.6 km || 
|-id=104 bgcolor=#fefefe
| 381104 ||  || — || February 15, 2007 || Catalina || CSS || — || align=right data-sort-value="0.90" | 900 m || 
|-id=105 bgcolor=#fefefe
| 381105 ||  || — || February 10, 2007 || Catalina || CSS || — || align=right data-sort-value="0.76" | 760 m || 
|-id=106 bgcolor=#fefefe
| 381106 ||  || — || February 15, 2007 || Catalina || CSS || — || align=right | 1.2 km || 
|-id=107 bgcolor=#fefefe
| 381107 ||  || — || February 17, 2007 || Kitt Peak || Spacewatch || V || align=right data-sort-value="0.71" | 710 m || 
|-id=108 bgcolor=#fefefe
| 381108 ||  || — || December 21, 2006 || Mount Lemmon || Mount Lemmon Survey || — || align=right data-sort-value="0.83" | 830 m || 
|-id=109 bgcolor=#fefefe
| 381109 ||  || — || February 17, 2007 || Kitt Peak || Spacewatch || — || align=right data-sort-value="0.78" | 780 m || 
|-id=110 bgcolor=#fefefe
| 381110 ||  || — || February 16, 2007 || Palomar || NEAT || NYS || align=right data-sort-value="0.77" | 770 m || 
|-id=111 bgcolor=#fefefe
| 381111 ||  || — || February 8, 2007 || Kitt Peak || Spacewatch || NYS || align=right data-sort-value="0.73" | 730 m || 
|-id=112 bgcolor=#fefefe
| 381112 ||  || — || February 17, 2007 || Kitt Peak || Spacewatch || — || align=right data-sort-value="0.67" | 670 m || 
|-id=113 bgcolor=#fefefe
| 381113 ||  || — || February 17, 2007 || Kitt Peak || Spacewatch || V || align=right data-sort-value="0.70" | 700 m || 
|-id=114 bgcolor=#fefefe
| 381114 ||  || — || February 17, 2007 || Kitt Peak || Spacewatch || — || align=right data-sort-value="0.89" | 890 m || 
|-id=115 bgcolor=#fefefe
| 381115 ||  || — || February 7, 2007 || Kitt Peak || Spacewatch || NYS || align=right data-sort-value="0.68" | 680 m || 
|-id=116 bgcolor=#fefefe
| 381116 ||  || — || February 17, 2007 || Kitt Peak || Spacewatch || NYS || align=right data-sort-value="0.56" | 560 m || 
|-id=117 bgcolor=#d6d6d6
| 381117 ||  || — || February 19, 2007 || Kitt Peak || Spacewatch || 3:2 || align=right | 4.3 km || 
|-id=118 bgcolor=#fefefe
| 381118 ||  || — || February 17, 2007 || Kitt Peak || Spacewatch || FLO || align=right data-sort-value="0.66" | 660 m || 
|-id=119 bgcolor=#fefefe
| 381119 ||  || — || February 22, 2007 || Gaisberg || R. Gierlinger || V || align=right data-sort-value="0.85" | 850 m || 
|-id=120 bgcolor=#fefefe
| 381120 ||  || — || January 13, 1996 || Kitt Peak || Spacewatch || NYS || align=right data-sort-value="0.53" | 530 m || 
|-id=121 bgcolor=#fefefe
| 381121 ||  || — || February 22, 2007 || Anderson Mesa || LONEOS || NYS || align=right data-sort-value="0.73" | 730 m || 
|-id=122 bgcolor=#fefefe
| 381122 ||  || — || February 21, 2007 || Kitt Peak || Spacewatch || NYS || align=right data-sort-value="0.76" | 760 m || 
|-id=123 bgcolor=#fefefe
| 381123 ||  || — || February 25, 2007 || Catalina || CSS || — || align=right | 1.2 km || 
|-id=124 bgcolor=#fefefe
| 381124 ||  || — || January 27, 2007 || Mount Lemmon || Mount Lemmon Survey || MAS || align=right data-sort-value="0.63" | 630 m || 
|-id=125 bgcolor=#E9E9E9
| 381125 ||  || — || February 27, 2007 || Kitt Peak || Spacewatch || — || align=right | 2.4 km || 
|-id=126 bgcolor=#fefefe
| 381126 ||  || — || February 23, 2007 || Kitt Peak || Spacewatch || NYS || align=right data-sort-value="0.83" | 830 m || 
|-id=127 bgcolor=#E9E9E9
| 381127 ||  || — || February 25, 2007 || Mount Lemmon || Mount Lemmon Survey || EUN || align=right | 1.5 km || 
|-id=128 bgcolor=#fefefe
| 381128 ||  || — || March 9, 2007 || Kitt Peak || Spacewatch || NYS || align=right data-sort-value="0.70" | 700 m || 
|-id=129 bgcolor=#fefefe
| 381129 ||  || — || March 9, 2007 || Palomar || NEAT || NYS || align=right data-sort-value="0.86" | 860 m || 
|-id=130 bgcolor=#E9E9E9
| 381130 ||  || — || March 10, 2007 || Mount Lemmon || Mount Lemmon Survey || — || align=right | 2.3 km || 
|-id=131 bgcolor=#E9E9E9
| 381131 ||  || — || March 10, 2007 || Kitt Peak || Spacewatch || — || align=right | 1.2 km || 
|-id=132 bgcolor=#E9E9E9
| 381132 ||  || — || March 10, 2007 || Kitt Peak || Spacewatch || — || align=right | 1.4 km || 
|-id=133 bgcolor=#E9E9E9
| 381133 ||  || — || March 9, 2007 || Kitt Peak || Spacewatch || EUN || align=right | 1.3 km || 
|-id=134 bgcolor=#fefefe
| 381134 ||  || — || March 10, 2007 || Kitt Peak || Spacewatch || — || align=right data-sort-value="0.76" | 760 m || 
|-id=135 bgcolor=#fefefe
| 381135 ||  || — || February 25, 2007 || Mount Lemmon || Mount Lemmon Survey || MAS || align=right | 1.00 km || 
|-id=136 bgcolor=#E9E9E9
| 381136 ||  || — || March 13, 2007 || Mount Lemmon || Mount Lemmon Survey || — || align=right | 1.3 km || 
|-id=137 bgcolor=#fefefe
| 381137 ||  || — || March 9, 2007 || Mount Lemmon || Mount Lemmon Survey || NYS || align=right data-sort-value="0.78" | 780 m || 
|-id=138 bgcolor=#E9E9E9
| 381138 ||  || — || March 12, 2007 || Mount Lemmon || Mount Lemmon Survey || — || align=right | 1.1 km || 
|-id=139 bgcolor=#E9E9E9
| 381139 ||  || — || March 12, 2007 || Mount Lemmon || Mount Lemmon Survey || — || align=right | 1.4 km || 
|-id=140 bgcolor=#E9E9E9
| 381140 ||  || — || February 23, 2007 || Kitt Peak || Spacewatch || — || align=right | 1.3 km || 
|-id=141 bgcolor=#E9E9E9
| 381141 ||  || — || March 13, 2007 || Kitt Peak || Spacewatch || — || align=right | 2.8 km || 
|-id=142 bgcolor=#fefefe
| 381142 ||  || — || March 15, 2007 || Kitt Peak || Spacewatch || — || align=right data-sort-value="0.89" | 890 m || 
|-id=143 bgcolor=#d6d6d6
| 381143 ||  || — || March 14, 2007 || Catalina || CSS || Tj (2.95) || align=right | 5.1 km || 
|-id=144 bgcolor=#C2FFFF
| 381144 ||  || — || March 11, 2007 || Mount Lemmon || Mount Lemmon Survey || L5ENM || align=right | 10 km || 
|-id=145 bgcolor=#fefefe
| 381145 ||  || — || February 26, 2007 || Mount Lemmon || Mount Lemmon Survey || NYS || align=right data-sort-value="0.58" | 580 m || 
|-id=146 bgcolor=#E9E9E9
| 381146 ||  || — || March 20, 2007 || Purple Mountain || PMO NEO || — || align=right | 1.8 km || 
|-id=147 bgcolor=#FA8072
| 381147 ||  || — || April 10, 2007 || Purple Mountain || PMO NEO || — || align=right | 1.3 km || 
|-id=148 bgcolor=#C2FFFF
| 381148 ||  || — || April 8, 2007 || Gaisberg || R. Gierlinger || L5 || align=right | 12 km || 
|-id=149 bgcolor=#E9E9E9
| 381149 ||  || — || April 14, 2007 || Bergisch Gladbach || W. Bickel || — || align=right | 2.9 km || 
|-id=150 bgcolor=#fefefe
| 381150 ||  || — || March 11, 2007 || Kitt Peak || Spacewatch || — || align=right data-sort-value="0.95" | 950 m || 
|-id=151 bgcolor=#E9E9E9
| 381151 ||  || — || April 11, 2007 || Kitt Peak || Spacewatch || — || align=right | 1.6 km || 
|-id=152 bgcolor=#E9E9E9
| 381152 ||  || — || April 11, 2007 || Mount Lemmon || Mount Lemmon Survey || — || align=right | 1.6 km || 
|-id=153 bgcolor=#E9E9E9
| 381153 ||  || — || April 11, 2007 || Kitt Peak || Spacewatch || WIT || align=right | 1.1 km || 
|-id=154 bgcolor=#fefefe
| 381154 ||  || — || April 11, 2007 || Kitt Peak || Spacewatch || NYS || align=right | 2.3 km || 
|-id=155 bgcolor=#E9E9E9
| 381155 ||  || — || April 11, 2007 || Kitt Peak || Spacewatch || — || align=right | 2.0 km || 
|-id=156 bgcolor=#E9E9E9
| 381156 ||  || — || April 14, 2007 || Mount Lemmon || Mount Lemmon Survey || INO || align=right | 1.6 km || 
|-id=157 bgcolor=#fefefe
| 381157 ||  || — || April 14, 2007 || Kitt Peak || Spacewatch || — || align=right data-sort-value="0.81" | 810 m || 
|-id=158 bgcolor=#E9E9E9
| 381158 ||  || — || April 14, 2007 || Kitt Peak || Spacewatch || — || align=right | 2.0 km || 
|-id=159 bgcolor=#E9E9E9
| 381159 ||  || — || April 15, 2007 || Kitt Peak || Spacewatch || — || align=right data-sort-value="0.85" | 850 m || 
|-id=160 bgcolor=#fefefe
| 381160 ||  || — || March 11, 2007 || Anderson Mesa || LONEOS || — || align=right data-sort-value="0.96" | 960 m || 
|-id=161 bgcolor=#E9E9E9
| 381161 ||  || — || April 15, 2007 || Catalina || CSS || EUN || align=right | 1.7 km || 
|-id=162 bgcolor=#E9E9E9
| 381162 ||  || — || April 16, 2007 || Mount Lemmon || Mount Lemmon Survey || HNA || align=right | 2.4 km || 
|-id=163 bgcolor=#E9E9E9
| 381163 ||  || — || April 20, 2007 || Mount Lemmon || Mount Lemmon Survey || — || align=right | 1.9 km || 
|-id=164 bgcolor=#E9E9E9
| 381164 ||  || — || April 20, 2007 || Kitt Peak || Spacewatch || — || align=right | 1.3 km || 
|-id=165 bgcolor=#E9E9E9
| 381165 ||  || — || April 15, 2007 || Catalina || CSS || — || align=right | 2.3 km || 
|-id=166 bgcolor=#E9E9E9
| 381166 ||  || — || April 22, 2007 || Kitt Peak || Spacewatch || — || align=right | 1.6 km || 
|-id=167 bgcolor=#fefefe
| 381167 ||  || — || April 23, 2007 || Kitt Peak || Spacewatch || LCI || align=right | 1.3 km || 
|-id=168 bgcolor=#E9E9E9
| 381168 ||  || — || April 19, 2007 || Anderson Mesa || LONEOS || — || align=right | 1.2 km || 
|-id=169 bgcolor=#E9E9E9
| 381169 ||  || — || April 23, 2007 || Catalina || CSS || — || align=right | 2.4 km || 
|-id=170 bgcolor=#E9E9E9
| 381170 ||  || — || April 25, 2007 || Kitt Peak || Spacewatch || — || align=right | 3.7 km || 
|-id=171 bgcolor=#E9E9E9
| 381171 ||  || — || April 25, 2007 || Mount Lemmon || Mount Lemmon Survey || — || align=right | 3.5 km || 
|-id=172 bgcolor=#E9E9E9
| 381172 ||  || — || March 11, 2007 || Mount Lemmon || Mount Lemmon Survey || JUN || align=right | 1.1 km || 
|-id=173 bgcolor=#E9E9E9
| 381173 ||  || — || May 7, 2007 || Kitt Peak || Spacewatch || — || align=right | 2.2 km || 
|-id=174 bgcolor=#E9E9E9
| 381174 ||  || — || May 9, 2007 || Mount Lemmon || Mount Lemmon Survey || HNA || align=right | 2.1 km || 
|-id=175 bgcolor=#E9E9E9
| 381175 ||  || — || May 10, 2007 || Calvin-Rehoboth || L. A. Molnar || — || align=right | 1.4 km || 
|-id=176 bgcolor=#E9E9E9
| 381176 ||  || — || April 25, 2007 || Kitt Peak || Spacewatch || AER || align=right | 1.3 km || 
|-id=177 bgcolor=#E9E9E9
| 381177 ||  || — || May 11, 2007 || Mount Lemmon || Mount Lemmon Survey || MAR || align=right data-sort-value="0.89" | 890 m || 
|-id=178 bgcolor=#E9E9E9
| 381178 ||  || — || May 10, 2007 || Anderson Mesa || LONEOS || — || align=right | 1.3 km || 
|-id=179 bgcolor=#fefefe
| 381179 ||  || — || May 11, 2007 || Mount Lemmon || Mount Lemmon Survey || H || align=right data-sort-value="0.68" | 680 m || 
|-id=180 bgcolor=#E9E9E9
| 381180 ||  || — || June 10, 2007 || Kitt Peak || Spacewatch || — || align=right | 1.7 km || 
|-id=181 bgcolor=#FFC2E0
| 381181 ||  || — || June 15, 2007 || Siding Spring || SSS || APO || align=right data-sort-value="0.6" | 600 m || 
|-id=182 bgcolor=#fefefe
| 381182 ||  || — || June 11, 2007 || Kitt Peak || Spacewatch || H || align=right data-sort-value="0.79" | 790 m || 
|-id=183 bgcolor=#E9E9E9
| 381183 ||  || — || June 12, 2007 || Kitt Peak || Spacewatch || — || align=right | 1.4 km || 
|-id=184 bgcolor=#E9E9E9
| 381184 ||  || — || June 12, 2007 || Kitt Peak || Spacewatch || — || align=right | 1.7 km || 
|-id=185 bgcolor=#E9E9E9
| 381185 ||  || — || November 4, 2004 || Kitt Peak || Spacewatch || — || align=right | 3.1 km || 
|-id=186 bgcolor=#E9E9E9
| 381186 ||  || — || April 22, 2007 || Catalina || CSS || RAF || align=right | 1.1 km || 
|-id=187 bgcolor=#E9E9E9
| 381187 ||  || — || July 10, 2007 || Siding Spring || SSS || — || align=right | 2.2 km || 
|-id=188 bgcolor=#fefefe
| 381188 ||  || — || July 20, 2007 || Reedy Creek || J. Broughton || NYS || align=right data-sort-value="0.71" | 710 m || 
|-id=189 bgcolor=#d6d6d6
| 381189 ||  || — || July 19, 2007 || Mount Lemmon || Mount Lemmon Survey || URS || align=right | 3.7 km || 
|-id=190 bgcolor=#d6d6d6
| 381190 ||  || — || August 12, 2007 || Socorro || LINEAR || TIR || align=right | 4.0 km || 
|-id=191 bgcolor=#d6d6d6
| 381191 ||  || — || August 10, 2007 || Kitt Peak || Spacewatch || — || align=right | 3.3 km || 
|-id=192 bgcolor=#d6d6d6
| 381192 ||  || — || August 10, 2007 || Kitt Peak || Spacewatch || — || align=right | 2.8 km || 
|-id=193 bgcolor=#d6d6d6
| 381193 ||  || — || August 24, 2007 || Kitt Peak || Spacewatch || — || align=right | 2.8 km || 
|-id=194 bgcolor=#E9E9E9
| 381194 ||  || — || June 5, 2007 || Catalina || CSS || BAR || align=right | 2.0 km || 
|-id=195 bgcolor=#d6d6d6
| 381195 ||  || — || August 22, 2007 || Socorro || LINEAR || — || align=right | 3.4 km || 
|-id=196 bgcolor=#E9E9E9
| 381196 ||  || — || September 27, 2003 || Kitt Peak || Spacewatch || XIZ || align=right | 1.7 km || 
|-id=197 bgcolor=#E9E9E9
| 381197 ||  || — || June 12, 2007 || Catalina || CSS || — || align=right | 4.1 km || 
|-id=198 bgcolor=#d6d6d6
| 381198 ||  || — || September 7, 2007 || Bergisch Gladbac || W. Bickel || — || align=right | 2.8 km || 
|-id=199 bgcolor=#d6d6d6
| 381199 ||  || — || September 9, 2007 || Kitt Peak || Spacewatch || — || align=right | 3.2 km || 
|-id=200 bgcolor=#d6d6d6
| 381200 ||  || — || September 9, 2007 || Mount Lemmon || Mount Lemmon Survey || — || align=right | 3.5 km || 
|}

381201–381300 

|-bgcolor=#d6d6d6
| 381201 ||  || — || September 9, 2007 || Kitt Peak || Spacewatch || — || align=right | 3.4 km || 
|-id=202 bgcolor=#d6d6d6
| 381202 ||  || — || September 9, 2007 || Kitt Peak || Spacewatch || — || align=right | 3.7 km || 
|-id=203 bgcolor=#d6d6d6
| 381203 ||  || — || September 10, 2007 || Kitt Peak || Spacewatch || THM || align=right | 2.3 km || 
|-id=204 bgcolor=#d6d6d6
| 381204 ||  || — || September 10, 2007 || Kitt Peak || Spacewatch || THM || align=right | 1.7 km || 
|-id=205 bgcolor=#d6d6d6
| 381205 ||  || — || September 10, 2007 || Kitt Peak || Spacewatch || — || align=right | 2.8 km || 
|-id=206 bgcolor=#d6d6d6
| 381206 ||  || — || September 11, 2007 || Catalina || CSS || TIR || align=right | 2.8 km || 
|-id=207 bgcolor=#d6d6d6
| 381207 ||  || — || September 11, 2007 || Mount Lemmon || Mount Lemmon Survey || — || align=right | 2.3 km || 
|-id=208 bgcolor=#d6d6d6
| 381208 ||  || — || September 12, 2007 || Catalina || CSS || — || align=right | 3.1 km || 
|-id=209 bgcolor=#d6d6d6
| 381209 ||  || — || September 12, 2007 || Mount Lemmon || Mount Lemmon Survey || EOS || align=right | 2.1 km || 
|-id=210 bgcolor=#d6d6d6
| 381210 ||  || — || September 12, 2007 || Catalina || CSS || — || align=right | 3.3 km || 
|-id=211 bgcolor=#d6d6d6
| 381211 ||  || — || September 12, 2007 || Mount Lemmon || Mount Lemmon Survey || HYG || align=right | 2.6 km || 
|-id=212 bgcolor=#d6d6d6
| 381212 ||  || — || August 24, 2007 || Kitt Peak || Spacewatch || — || align=right | 3.0 km || 
|-id=213 bgcolor=#d6d6d6
| 381213 ||  || — || September 10, 2007 || Kitt Peak || Spacewatch || — || align=right | 3.1 km || 
|-id=214 bgcolor=#d6d6d6
| 381214 ||  || — || September 12, 2007 || Kitt Peak || Spacewatch || — || align=right | 2.9 km || 
|-id=215 bgcolor=#d6d6d6
| 381215 ||  || — || September 13, 2007 || Catalina || CSS || — || align=right | 3.9 km || 
|-id=216 bgcolor=#d6d6d6
| 381216 ||  || — || September 10, 2007 || Kitt Peak || Spacewatch || — || align=right | 2.6 km || 
|-id=217 bgcolor=#d6d6d6
| 381217 ||  || — || August 21, 2007 || Anderson Mesa || LONEOS || — || align=right | 2.5 km || 
|-id=218 bgcolor=#d6d6d6
| 381218 ||  || — || September 12, 2007 || Catalina || CSS || — || align=right | 3.4 km || 
|-id=219 bgcolor=#d6d6d6
| 381219 ||  || — || September 14, 2007 || Mount Lemmon || Mount Lemmon Survey || — || align=right | 2.7 km || 
|-id=220 bgcolor=#d6d6d6
| 381220 ||  || — || September 11, 2007 || Kitt Peak || Spacewatch || — || align=right | 3.6 km || 
|-id=221 bgcolor=#d6d6d6
| 381221 ||  || — || September 12, 2007 || Catalina || CSS || EOS || align=right | 2.4 km || 
|-id=222 bgcolor=#d6d6d6
| 381222 ||  || — || September 15, 2007 || Kitt Peak || Spacewatch || — || align=right | 3.4 km || 
|-id=223 bgcolor=#d6d6d6
| 381223 ||  || — || September 15, 2007 || Kitt Peak || Spacewatch || — || align=right | 2.4 km || 
|-id=224 bgcolor=#d6d6d6
| 381224 ||  || — || September 5, 2007 || Siding Spring || SSS || — || align=right | 4.7 km || 
|-id=225 bgcolor=#d6d6d6
| 381225 ||  || — || September 12, 2007 || Kitt Peak || Spacewatch || THM || align=right | 2.1 km || 
|-id=226 bgcolor=#d6d6d6
| 381226 ||  || — || September 13, 2007 || Mount Lemmon || Mount Lemmon Survey || — || align=right | 2.5 km || 
|-id=227 bgcolor=#d6d6d6
| 381227 ||  || — || September 14, 2007 || Mount Lemmon || Mount Lemmon Survey || — || align=right | 2.2 km || 
|-id=228 bgcolor=#d6d6d6
| 381228 ||  || — || September 14, 2007 || Catalina || CSS || — || align=right | 4.3 km || 
|-id=229 bgcolor=#d6d6d6
| 381229 ||  || — || September 16, 2007 || Socorro || LINEAR || — || align=right | 3.4 km || 
|-id=230 bgcolor=#d6d6d6
| 381230 ||  || — || September 25, 2007 || Mount Lemmon || Mount Lemmon Survey || EOS || align=right | 2.1 km || 
|-id=231 bgcolor=#d6d6d6
| 381231 ||  || — || September 26, 2007 || Mount Lemmon || Mount Lemmon Survey || — || align=right | 3.7 km || 
|-id=232 bgcolor=#d6d6d6
| 381232 ||  || — || October 6, 2007 || La Sagra || OAM Obs. || — || align=right | 5.9 km || 
|-id=233 bgcolor=#d6d6d6
| 381233 ||  || — || October 6, 2007 || Socorro || LINEAR || — || align=right | 3.4 km || 
|-id=234 bgcolor=#d6d6d6
| 381234 ||  || — || October 6, 2007 || Socorro || LINEAR || EUP || align=right | 4.9 km || 
|-id=235 bgcolor=#d6d6d6
| 381235 ||  || — || October 7, 2007 || Altschwendt || W. Ries || — || align=right | 4.0 km || 
|-id=236 bgcolor=#d6d6d6
| 381236 ||  || — || October 6, 2007 || Kitt Peak || Spacewatch || EOS || align=right | 2.1 km || 
|-id=237 bgcolor=#d6d6d6
| 381237 ||  || — || October 4, 2007 || Catalina || CSS || — || align=right | 3.5 km || 
|-id=238 bgcolor=#d6d6d6
| 381238 ||  || — || October 7, 2007 || Mount Lemmon || Mount Lemmon Survey || — || align=right | 2.6 km || 
|-id=239 bgcolor=#d6d6d6
| 381239 ||  || — || October 7, 2007 || Mount Lemmon || Mount Lemmon Survey || EOS || align=right | 2.1 km || 
|-id=240 bgcolor=#d6d6d6
| 381240 ||  || — || October 7, 2007 || Kitt Peak || Spacewatch || — || align=right | 3.3 km || 
|-id=241 bgcolor=#d6d6d6
| 381241 ||  || — || October 7, 2007 || Kitt Peak || Spacewatch || TIR || align=right | 3.5 km || 
|-id=242 bgcolor=#d6d6d6
| 381242 ||  || — || September 9, 2007 || Mount Lemmon || Mount Lemmon Survey || — || align=right | 3.3 km || 
|-id=243 bgcolor=#d6d6d6
| 381243 ||  || — || October 7, 2007 || Mount Lemmon || Mount Lemmon Survey || — || align=right | 2.6 km || 
|-id=244 bgcolor=#d6d6d6
| 381244 ||  || — || October 9, 2007 || Needville || Needville Obs. || — || align=right | 2.8 km || 
|-id=245 bgcolor=#d6d6d6
| 381245 ||  || — || October 7, 2007 || Saint-Sulpice || B. Christophe || TIR || align=right | 2.8 km || 
|-id=246 bgcolor=#d6d6d6
| 381246 ||  || — || October 5, 2007 || Kitt Peak || Spacewatch || — || align=right | 2.4 km || 
|-id=247 bgcolor=#d6d6d6
| 381247 ||  || — || October 5, 2007 || Kitt Peak || Spacewatch || EOS || align=right | 2.6 km || 
|-id=248 bgcolor=#d6d6d6
| 381248 ||  || — || September 12, 2007 || Catalina || CSS || TIR || align=right | 3.5 km || 
|-id=249 bgcolor=#d6d6d6
| 381249 ||  || — || October 13, 2007 || Calvin-Rehoboth || Calvin–Rehoboth Obs. || — || align=right | 4.0 km || 
|-id=250 bgcolor=#d6d6d6
| 381250 ||  || — || October 4, 2007 || Kitt Peak || Spacewatch || — || align=right | 3.1 km || 
|-id=251 bgcolor=#d6d6d6
| 381251 ||  || — || October 9, 2007 || 7300 Observatory || W. K. Y. Yeung || ALA || align=right | 4.5 km || 
|-id=252 bgcolor=#d6d6d6
| 381252 ||  || — || October 6, 2007 || Kitt Peak || Spacewatch || — || align=right | 5.8 km || 
|-id=253 bgcolor=#d6d6d6
| 381253 ||  || — || October 6, 2007 || Kitt Peak || Spacewatch || — || align=right | 2.4 km || 
|-id=254 bgcolor=#d6d6d6
| 381254 ||  || — || October 6, 2007 || Kitt Peak || Spacewatch || HYG || align=right | 3.0 km || 
|-id=255 bgcolor=#d6d6d6
| 381255 ||  || — || October 9, 2007 || Catalina || CSS || — || align=right | 4.0 km || 
|-id=256 bgcolor=#d6d6d6
| 381256 ||  || — || October 9, 2007 || Socorro || LINEAR || EOS || align=right | 2.3 km || 
|-id=257 bgcolor=#d6d6d6
| 381257 ||  || — || October 9, 2007 || Socorro || LINEAR || LIX || align=right | 4.0 km || 
|-id=258 bgcolor=#d6d6d6
| 381258 ||  || — || September 25, 2007 || Mount Lemmon || Mount Lemmon Survey || TIR || align=right | 3.2 km || 
|-id=259 bgcolor=#d6d6d6
| 381259 ||  || — || October 11, 2007 || Catalina || CSS || — || align=right | 3.6 km || 
|-id=260 bgcolor=#d6d6d6
| 381260 Ouellette ||  ||  || October 11, 2007 || Mauna Kea || D. D. Balam || EOS || align=right | 2.4 km || 
|-id=261 bgcolor=#d6d6d6
| 381261 ||  || — || October 5, 2007 || Kitt Peak || Spacewatch || — || align=right | 4.6 km || 
|-id=262 bgcolor=#d6d6d6
| 381262 ||  || — || September 25, 2007 || Mount Lemmon || Mount Lemmon Survey || — || align=right | 3.9 km || 
|-id=263 bgcolor=#d6d6d6
| 381263 ||  || — || October 7, 2007 || 7300 || W. K. Y. Yeung || THM || align=right | 2.5 km || 
|-id=264 bgcolor=#d6d6d6
| 381264 ||  || — || October 4, 2007 || Mount Lemmon || Mount Lemmon Survey || — || align=right | 3.0 km || 
|-id=265 bgcolor=#d6d6d6
| 381265 ||  || — || October 7, 2007 || Mount Lemmon || Mount Lemmon Survey || HYG || align=right | 2.9 km || 
|-id=266 bgcolor=#d6d6d6
| 381266 ||  || — || October 8, 2007 || Mount Lemmon || Mount Lemmon Survey || HYG || align=right | 2.6 km || 
|-id=267 bgcolor=#d6d6d6
| 381267 ||  || — || October 8, 2007 || Mount Lemmon || Mount Lemmon Survey || HYG || align=right | 3.3 km || 
|-id=268 bgcolor=#d6d6d6
| 381268 ||  || — || September 25, 2007 || Mount Lemmon || Mount Lemmon Survey || EMA || align=right | 3.3 km || 
|-id=269 bgcolor=#d6d6d6
| 381269 ||  || — || October 8, 2007 || Kitt Peak || Spacewatch || EUP || align=right | 3.8 km || 
|-id=270 bgcolor=#d6d6d6
| 381270 ||  || — || October 8, 2007 || Kitt Peak || Spacewatch || — || align=right | 3.3 km || 
|-id=271 bgcolor=#d6d6d6
| 381271 ||  || — || October 8, 2007 || Mount Lemmon || Mount Lemmon Survey || — || align=right | 3.3 km || 
|-id=272 bgcolor=#d6d6d6
| 381272 ||  || — || October 9, 2007 || Mount Lemmon || Mount Lemmon Survey || — || align=right | 2.4 km || 
|-id=273 bgcolor=#d6d6d6
| 381273 ||  || — || October 9, 2007 || Catalina || CSS || — || align=right | 3.6 km || 
|-id=274 bgcolor=#d6d6d6
| 381274 ||  || — || October 10, 2007 || Kitt Peak || Spacewatch || — || align=right | 2.6 km || 
|-id=275 bgcolor=#d6d6d6
| 381275 ||  || — || October 8, 2007 || Mount Lemmon || Mount Lemmon Survey || EOS || align=right | 2.0 km || 
|-id=276 bgcolor=#d6d6d6
| 381276 ||  || — || October 11, 2007 || Catalina || CSS || — || align=right | 4.4 km || 
|-id=277 bgcolor=#d6d6d6
| 381277 ||  || — || October 12, 2007 || Mount Lemmon || Mount Lemmon Survey || — || align=right | 5.0 km || 
|-id=278 bgcolor=#d6d6d6
| 381278 ||  || — || October 12, 2007 || Mount Lemmon || Mount Lemmon Survey || — || align=right | 3.7 km || 
|-id=279 bgcolor=#d6d6d6
| 381279 ||  || — || October 12, 2007 || Kitt Peak || Spacewatch || HYG || align=right | 2.9 km || 
|-id=280 bgcolor=#d6d6d6
| 381280 ||  || — || October 11, 2007 || Kitt Peak || Spacewatch || — || align=right | 2.8 km || 
|-id=281 bgcolor=#d6d6d6
| 381281 ||  || — || October 13, 2007 || Catalina || CSS || — || align=right | 2.7 km || 
|-id=282 bgcolor=#d6d6d6
| 381282 ||  || — || October 11, 2007 || Catalina || CSS || THB || align=right | 3.6 km || 
|-id=283 bgcolor=#d6d6d6
| 381283 ||  || — || October 14, 2007 || Mount Lemmon || Mount Lemmon Survey || — || align=right | 3.3 km || 
|-id=284 bgcolor=#d6d6d6
| 381284 ||  || — || October 15, 2007 || Kitt Peak || Spacewatch || EOS || align=right | 1.8 km || 
|-id=285 bgcolor=#d6d6d6
| 381285 ||  || — || October 15, 2007 || Catalina || CSS || — || align=right | 3.6 km || 
|-id=286 bgcolor=#d6d6d6
| 381286 ||  || — || October 10, 2007 || Catalina || CSS || — || align=right | 4.2 km || 
|-id=287 bgcolor=#d6d6d6
| 381287 ||  || — || October 8, 2007 || Kitt Peak || Spacewatch || — || align=right | 4.8 km || 
|-id=288 bgcolor=#d6d6d6
| 381288 ||  || — || October 6, 2007 || Kitt Peak || Spacewatch || — || align=right | 5.0 km || 
|-id=289 bgcolor=#d6d6d6
| 381289 ||  || — || October 10, 2007 || Catalina || CSS || TIR || align=right | 4.0 km || 
|-id=290 bgcolor=#d6d6d6
| 381290 ||  || — || October 8, 2007 || Catalina || CSS || — || align=right | 3.3 km || 
|-id=291 bgcolor=#d6d6d6
| 381291 ||  || — || October 9, 2007 || Mount Lemmon || Mount Lemmon Survey || — || align=right | 4.2 km || 
|-id=292 bgcolor=#d6d6d6
| 381292 ||  || — || October 8, 2007 || Catalina || CSS || — || align=right | 4.2 km || 
|-id=293 bgcolor=#d6d6d6
| 381293 ||  || — || October 12, 2007 || Catalina || CSS || EUP || align=right | 3.2 km || 
|-id=294 bgcolor=#d6d6d6
| 381294 ||  || — || October 16, 2007 || Bisei SG Center || BATTeRS || EOS || align=right | 2.2 km || 
|-id=295 bgcolor=#d6d6d6
| 381295 ||  || — || October 16, 2007 || Catalina || CSS || EOS || align=right | 2.6 km || 
|-id=296 bgcolor=#d6d6d6
| 381296 ||  || — || October 16, 2007 || Kitt Peak || Spacewatch || ALA || align=right | 5.3 km || 
|-id=297 bgcolor=#d6d6d6
| 381297 ||  || — || October 16, 2007 || Catalina || CSS || — || align=right | 4.5 km || 
|-id=298 bgcolor=#d6d6d6
| 381298 ||  || — || October 16, 2007 || Catalina || CSS || — || align=right | 3.1 km || 
|-id=299 bgcolor=#d6d6d6
| 381299 ||  || — || October 13, 2007 || Kitt Peak || Spacewatch || HYG || align=right | 3.1 km || 
|-id=300 bgcolor=#d6d6d6
| 381300 ||  || — || October 20, 2007 || Catalina || CSS || — || align=right | 3.0 km || 
|}

381301–381400 

|-bgcolor=#d6d6d6
| 381301 ||  || — || October 30, 2007 || Kitt Peak || Spacewatch || — || align=right | 3.4 km || 
|-id=302 bgcolor=#d6d6d6
| 381302 ||  || — || October 30, 2007 || Kitt Peak || Spacewatch || — || align=right | 4.0 km || 
|-id=303 bgcolor=#d6d6d6
| 381303 ||  || — || October 31, 2007 || Mount Lemmon || Mount Lemmon Survey || — || align=right | 4.5 km || 
|-id=304 bgcolor=#d6d6d6
| 381304 ||  || — || November 2, 2007 || Dauban || Chante-Perdrix Obs. || — || align=right | 2.7 km || 
|-id=305 bgcolor=#d6d6d6
| 381305 ||  || — || November 1, 2007 || Mount Lemmon || Mount Lemmon Survey || — || align=right | 2.6 km || 
|-id=306 bgcolor=#d6d6d6
| 381306 ||  || — || September 25, 2007 || Mount Lemmon || Mount Lemmon Survey || LIX || align=right | 4.0 km || 
|-id=307 bgcolor=#d6d6d6
| 381307 ||  || — || November 2, 2007 || Mount Lemmon || Mount Lemmon Survey || — || align=right | 3.2 km || 
|-id=308 bgcolor=#d6d6d6
| 381308 ||  || — || November 1, 2007 || Kitt Peak || Spacewatch || — || align=right | 4.7 km || 
|-id=309 bgcolor=#d6d6d6
| 381309 ||  || — || November 1, 2007 || Kitt Peak || Spacewatch || — || align=right | 3.5 km || 
|-id=310 bgcolor=#d6d6d6
| 381310 ||  || — || November 4, 2007 || Socorro || LINEAR || — || align=right | 5.3 km || 
|-id=311 bgcolor=#d6d6d6
| 381311 ||  || — || November 3, 2007 || Socorro || LINEAR || — || align=right | 3.7 km || 
|-id=312 bgcolor=#d6d6d6
| 381312 ||  || — || October 10, 2007 || Kitt Peak || Spacewatch || — || align=right | 3.6 km || 
|-id=313 bgcolor=#d6d6d6
| 381313 ||  || — || November 4, 2007 || Mount Lemmon || Mount Lemmon Survey || — || align=right | 3.7 km || 
|-id=314 bgcolor=#d6d6d6
| 381314 ||  || — || November 4, 2007 || Kitt Peak || Spacewatch || — || align=right | 3.1 km || 
|-id=315 bgcolor=#d6d6d6
| 381315 ||  || — || November 5, 2007 || Kitt Peak || Spacewatch || — || align=right | 3.3 km || 
|-id=316 bgcolor=#d6d6d6
| 381316 ||  || — || November 7, 2007 || Mount Lemmon || Mount Lemmon Survey || — || align=right | 2.5 km || 
|-id=317 bgcolor=#d6d6d6
| 381317 ||  || — || November 9, 2007 || Kitt Peak || Spacewatch || EUP || align=right | 4.3 km || 
|-id=318 bgcolor=#d6d6d6
| 381318 ||  || — || November 9, 2007 || Kitt Peak || Spacewatch || — || align=right | 3.8 km || 
|-id=319 bgcolor=#d6d6d6
| 381319 ||  || — || November 7, 2007 || Catalina || CSS || — || align=right | 4.5 km || 
|-id=320 bgcolor=#d6d6d6
| 381320 ||  || — || November 9, 2007 || Mount Lemmon || Mount Lemmon Survey || — || align=right | 3.6 km || 
|-id=321 bgcolor=#d6d6d6
| 381321 ||  || — || November 7, 2007 || Kitt Peak || Spacewatch || — || align=right | 3.4 km || 
|-id=322 bgcolor=#d6d6d6
| 381322 ||  || — || November 9, 2007 || Catalina || CSS || — || align=right | 4.4 km || 
|-id=323 bgcolor=#d6d6d6
| 381323 Fanjinshi ||  ||  || October 9, 2007 || XuYi || PMO NEO || — || align=right | 4.8 km || 
|-id=324 bgcolor=#d6d6d6
| 381324 ||  || — || November 13, 2007 || Kitt Peak || Spacewatch || — || align=right | 2.6 km || 
|-id=325 bgcolor=#d6d6d6
| 381325 ||  || — || November 15, 2007 || Mount Lemmon || Mount Lemmon Survey || EMA || align=right | 3.9 km || 
|-id=326 bgcolor=#d6d6d6
| 381326 ||  || — || November 2, 2007 || Kitt Peak || Spacewatch || — || align=right | 3.7 km || 
|-id=327 bgcolor=#d6d6d6
| 381327 ||  || — || November 14, 2007 || Kitt Peak || Spacewatch || EUP || align=right | 5.0 km || 
|-id=328 bgcolor=#d6d6d6
| 381328 ||  || — || November 12, 2007 || Mount Lemmon || Mount Lemmon Survey || — || align=right | 4.3 km || 
|-id=329 bgcolor=#d6d6d6
| 381329 ||  || — || November 3, 2007 || Catalina || CSS || Tj (2.96) || align=right | 4.9 km || 
|-id=330 bgcolor=#d6d6d6
| 381330 ||  || — || November 4, 2007 || Mount Lemmon || Mount Lemmon Survey || — || align=right | 3.9 km || 
|-id=331 bgcolor=#d6d6d6
| 381331 ||  || — || November 8, 2007 || Socorro || LINEAR || — || align=right | 4.1 km || 
|-id=332 bgcolor=#d6d6d6
| 381332 ||  || — || November 21, 2007 || Catalina || CSS || — || align=right | 3.6 km || 
|-id=333 bgcolor=#d6d6d6
| 381333 ||  || — || December 4, 2007 || Catalina || CSS || — || align=right | 3.9 km || 
|-id=334 bgcolor=#d6d6d6
| 381334 ||  || — || December 3, 2007 || Socorro || LINEAR || EUP || align=right | 4.9 km || 
|-id=335 bgcolor=#d6d6d6
| 381335 ||  || — || December 28, 2007 || Kitt Peak || Spacewatch || 7:4 || align=right | 2.8 km || 
|-id=336 bgcolor=#fefefe
| 381336 ||  || — || January 11, 2008 || Kitt Peak || Spacewatch || — || align=right data-sort-value="0.81" | 810 m || 
|-id=337 bgcolor=#fefefe
| 381337 ||  || — || January 15, 2008 || Mount Lemmon || Mount Lemmon Survey || — || align=right data-sort-value="0.94" | 940 m || 
|-id=338 bgcolor=#fefefe
| 381338 ||  || — || January 30, 2008 || Mount Lemmon || Mount Lemmon Survey || — || align=right data-sort-value="0.78" | 780 m || 
|-id=339 bgcolor=#fefefe
| 381339 ||  || — || January 30, 2008 || Mount Lemmon || Mount Lemmon Survey || — || align=right data-sort-value="0.66" | 660 m || 
|-id=340 bgcolor=#d6d6d6
| 381340 ||  || — || January 16, 2008 || Kitt Peak || Spacewatch || 7:4 || align=right | 4.6 km || 
|-id=341 bgcolor=#fefefe
| 381341 ||  || — || March 10, 2005 || Kitt Peak || Spacewatch || — || align=right data-sort-value="0.68" | 680 m || 
|-id=342 bgcolor=#fefefe
| 381342 ||  || — || February 3, 2008 || Kitt Peak || Spacewatch || V || align=right data-sort-value="0.72" | 720 m || 
|-id=343 bgcolor=#fefefe
| 381343 ||  || — || February 1, 2008 || Kitt Peak || Spacewatch || FLO || align=right data-sort-value="0.67" | 670 m || 
|-id=344 bgcolor=#fefefe
| 381344 ||  || — || January 11, 2008 || Kitt Peak || Spacewatch || — || align=right data-sort-value="0.80" | 800 m || 
|-id=345 bgcolor=#fefefe
| 381345 ||  || — || February 8, 2008 || Dauban || F. Kugel || FLO || align=right data-sort-value="0.69" | 690 m || 
|-id=346 bgcolor=#fefefe
| 381346 ||  || — || February 9, 2008 || Mount Lemmon || Mount Lemmon Survey || V || align=right data-sort-value="0.52" | 520 m || 
|-id=347 bgcolor=#fefefe
| 381347 ||  || — || February 7, 2008 || Kitt Peak || Spacewatch || — || align=right data-sort-value="0.89" | 890 m || 
|-id=348 bgcolor=#fefefe
| 381348 ||  || — || February 8, 2008 || Kitt Peak || Spacewatch || FLO || align=right data-sort-value="0.66" | 660 m || 
|-id=349 bgcolor=#fefefe
| 381349 ||  || — || February 8, 2008 || Kitt Peak || Spacewatch || — || align=right data-sort-value="0.61" | 610 m || 
|-id=350 bgcolor=#fefefe
| 381350 ||  || — || February 9, 2008 || Kitt Peak || Spacewatch || — || align=right | 1.0 km || 
|-id=351 bgcolor=#d6d6d6
| 381351 ||  || — || February 6, 2008 || Socorro || LINEAR || EUP || align=right | 6.8 km || 
|-id=352 bgcolor=#fefefe
| 381352 ||  || — || February 3, 2008 || Kitt Peak || Spacewatch || — || align=right data-sort-value="0.83" | 830 m || 
|-id=353 bgcolor=#fefefe
| 381353 ||  || — || February 7, 2008 || Kitt Peak || Spacewatch || — || align=right data-sort-value="0.75" | 750 m || 
|-id=354 bgcolor=#fefefe
| 381354 ||  || — || February 12, 2008 || Mount Lemmon || Mount Lemmon Survey || — || align=right data-sort-value="0.68" | 680 m || 
|-id=355 bgcolor=#fefefe
| 381355 ||  || — || February 27, 2008 || Kitt Peak || Spacewatch || — || align=right data-sort-value="0.76" | 760 m || 
|-id=356 bgcolor=#fefefe
| 381356 ||  || — || February 27, 2008 || Mount Lemmon || Mount Lemmon Survey || — || align=right data-sort-value="0.90" | 900 m || 
|-id=357 bgcolor=#fefefe
| 381357 ||  || — || February 27, 2008 || Kitt Peak || Spacewatch || — || align=right data-sort-value="0.79" | 790 m || 
|-id=358 bgcolor=#d6d6d6
| 381358 ||  || — || February 28, 2008 || Catalina || CSS || EUP || align=right | 5.9 km || 
|-id=359 bgcolor=#fefefe
| 381359 ||  || — || February 26, 2008 || Kitt Peak || Spacewatch || — || align=right data-sort-value="0.69" | 690 m || 
|-id=360 bgcolor=#fefefe
| 381360 ||  || — || February 28, 2008 || Lulin || LUSS || — || align=right data-sort-value="0.98" | 980 m || 
|-id=361 bgcolor=#fefefe
| 381361 ||  || — || February 18, 2008 || Mount Lemmon || Mount Lemmon Survey || FLO || align=right data-sort-value="0.71" | 710 m || 
|-id=362 bgcolor=#fefefe
| 381362 ||  || — || March 1, 2008 || Kitt Peak || Spacewatch || — || align=right data-sort-value="0.56" | 560 m || 
|-id=363 bgcolor=#fefefe
| 381363 ||  || — || March 2, 2008 || Kitt Peak || Spacewatch || — || align=right data-sort-value="0.80" | 800 m || 
|-id=364 bgcolor=#fefefe
| 381364 ||  || — || March 3, 2008 || Mount Lemmon || Mount Lemmon Survey || — || align=right data-sort-value="0.94" | 940 m || 
|-id=365 bgcolor=#fefefe
| 381365 ||  || — || March 4, 2008 || Kitt Peak || Spacewatch || — || align=right data-sort-value="0.87" | 870 m || 
|-id=366 bgcolor=#fefefe
| 381366 ||  || — || February 9, 2008 || Kitt Peak || Spacewatch || FLO || align=right data-sort-value="0.62" | 620 m || 
|-id=367 bgcolor=#fefefe
| 381367 ||  || — || March 8, 2008 || Mount Lemmon || Mount Lemmon Survey || FLO || align=right data-sort-value="0.55" | 550 m || 
|-id=368 bgcolor=#fefefe
| 381368 ||  || — || March 8, 2008 || Socorro || LINEAR || V || align=right data-sort-value="0.79" | 790 m || 
|-id=369 bgcolor=#fefefe
| 381369 ||  || — || February 10, 2008 || Kitt Peak || Spacewatch || NYS || align=right data-sort-value="0.63" | 630 m || 
|-id=370 bgcolor=#fefefe
| 381370 ||  || — || March 8, 2008 || Kitt Peak || Spacewatch || — || align=right data-sort-value="0.68" | 680 m || 
|-id=371 bgcolor=#fefefe
| 381371 ||  || — || March 11, 2008 || Mount Lemmon || Mount Lemmon Survey || V || align=right data-sort-value="0.68" | 680 m || 
|-id=372 bgcolor=#d6d6d6
| 381372 ||  || — || March 1, 2008 || Kitt Peak || Spacewatch || 3:2 || align=right | 4.0 km || 
|-id=373 bgcolor=#fefefe
| 381373 ||  || — || March 27, 2008 || Kitt Peak || Spacewatch || — || align=right data-sort-value="0.75" | 750 m || 
|-id=374 bgcolor=#fefefe
| 381374 ||  || — || March 28, 2008 || Mount Lemmon || Mount Lemmon Survey || — || align=right data-sort-value="0.82" | 820 m || 
|-id=375 bgcolor=#fefefe
| 381375 ||  || — || March 28, 2008 || Kitt Peak || Spacewatch || — || align=right | 2.4 km || 
|-id=376 bgcolor=#fefefe
| 381376 ||  || — || March 28, 2008 || Kitt Peak || Spacewatch || MAS || align=right data-sort-value="0.82" | 820 m || 
|-id=377 bgcolor=#fefefe
| 381377 ||  || — || March 28, 2008 || Mount Lemmon || Mount Lemmon Survey || — || align=right data-sort-value="0.75" | 750 m || 
|-id=378 bgcolor=#fefefe
| 381378 ||  || — || March 30, 2008 || Kitt Peak || Spacewatch || — || align=right data-sort-value="0.77" | 770 m || 
|-id=379 bgcolor=#fefefe
| 381379 ||  || — || March 30, 2008 || Kitt Peak || Spacewatch || FLO || align=right data-sort-value="0.63" | 630 m || 
|-id=380 bgcolor=#fefefe
| 381380 ||  || — || March 31, 2008 || Mount Lemmon || Mount Lemmon Survey || — || align=right data-sort-value="0.65" | 650 m || 
|-id=381 bgcolor=#fefefe
| 381381 ||  || — || March 31, 2008 || Mount Lemmon || Mount Lemmon Survey || — || align=right data-sort-value="0.90" | 900 m || 
|-id=382 bgcolor=#fefefe
| 381382 ||  || — || March 30, 2008 || Kitt Peak || Spacewatch || MAS || align=right data-sort-value="0.84" | 840 m || 
|-id=383 bgcolor=#fefefe
| 381383 ||  || — || March 26, 2008 || Mount Lemmon || Mount Lemmon Survey || — || align=right data-sort-value="0.75" | 750 m || 
|-id=384 bgcolor=#C2FFFF
| 381384 ||  || — || March 31, 2008 || Kitt Peak || Spacewatch || L5 || align=right | 8.0 km || 
|-id=385 bgcolor=#fefefe
| 381385 ||  || — || April 5, 2008 || Socorro || LINEAR || FLO || align=right data-sort-value="0.74" | 740 m || 
|-id=386 bgcolor=#fefefe
| 381386 ||  || — || April 3, 2008 || Kitt Peak || Spacewatch || — || align=right data-sort-value="0.87" | 870 m || 
|-id=387 bgcolor=#fefefe
| 381387 ||  || — || April 3, 2008 || Kitt Peak || Spacewatch || V || align=right data-sort-value="0.65" | 650 m || 
|-id=388 bgcolor=#fefefe
| 381388 ||  || — || April 3, 2008 || Kitt Peak || Spacewatch || ERI || align=right | 1.7 km || 
|-id=389 bgcolor=#fefefe
| 381389 ||  || — || April 3, 2008 || Mount Lemmon || Mount Lemmon Survey || MAScritical || align=right data-sort-value="0.71" | 710 m || 
|-id=390 bgcolor=#fefefe
| 381390 ||  || — || April 4, 2008 || Kitt Peak || Spacewatch || — || align=right data-sort-value="0.81" | 810 m || 
|-id=391 bgcolor=#fefefe
| 381391 ||  || — || March 26, 2008 || Kitt Peak || Spacewatch || — || align=right | 1.3 km || 
|-id=392 bgcolor=#fefefe
| 381392 ||  || — || April 4, 2008 || Kitt Peak || Spacewatch || — || align=right data-sort-value="0.86" | 860 m || 
|-id=393 bgcolor=#fefefe
| 381393 ||  || — || April 5, 2008 || Mount Lemmon || Mount Lemmon Survey || MAS || align=right data-sort-value="0.76" | 760 m || 
|-id=394 bgcolor=#fefefe
| 381394 ||  || — || April 5, 2008 || Catalina || CSS || — || align=right data-sort-value="0.85" | 850 m || 
|-id=395 bgcolor=#E9E9E9
| 381395 ||  || — || April 5, 2008 || Catalina || CSS || — || align=right | 1.4 km || 
|-id=396 bgcolor=#fefefe
| 381396 ||  || — || April 6, 2008 || Kitt Peak || Spacewatch || — || align=right | 1.0 km || 
|-id=397 bgcolor=#fefefe
| 381397 ||  || — || April 7, 2008 || Kitt Peak || Spacewatch || — || align=right | 1.00 km || 
|-id=398 bgcolor=#fefefe
| 381398 ||  || — || April 8, 2008 || Kitt Peak || Spacewatch || — || align=right data-sort-value="0.78" | 780 m || 
|-id=399 bgcolor=#fefefe
| 381399 ||  || — || March 27, 2008 || Kitt Peak || Spacewatch || — || align=right data-sort-value="0.83" | 830 m || 
|-id=400 bgcolor=#fefefe
| 381400 ||  || — || April 11, 2008 || Catalina || CSS || — || align=right | 1.2 km || 
|}

381401–381500 

|-bgcolor=#fefefe
| 381401 ||  || — || April 11, 2008 || Mount Lemmon || Mount Lemmon Survey || V || align=right data-sort-value="0.83" | 830 m || 
|-id=402 bgcolor=#fefefe
| 381402 ||  || — || April 11, 2008 || Kitt Peak || Spacewatch || — || align=right data-sort-value="0.87" | 870 m || 
|-id=403 bgcolor=#fefefe
| 381403 ||  || — || March 11, 2008 || Mount Lemmon || Mount Lemmon Survey || FLO || align=right data-sort-value="0.68" | 680 m || 
|-id=404 bgcolor=#fefefe
| 381404 ||  || — || April 7, 2008 || Kitt Peak || Spacewatch || — || align=right data-sort-value="0.80" | 800 m || 
|-id=405 bgcolor=#fefefe
| 381405 ||  || — || April 25, 2008 || Kitt Peak || Spacewatch || — || align=right data-sort-value="0.68" | 680 m || 
|-id=406 bgcolor=#fefefe
| 381406 ||  || — || April 29, 2008 || Mount Lemmon || Mount Lemmon Survey || — || align=right | 1.3 km || 
|-id=407 bgcolor=#fefefe
| 381407 ||  || — || April 28, 2008 || Kitt Peak || Spacewatch || — || align=right | 1.1 km || 
|-id=408 bgcolor=#fefefe
| 381408 ||  || — || April 26, 2008 || Mount Lemmon || Mount Lemmon Survey || critical || align=right data-sort-value="0.75" | 750 m || 
|-id=409 bgcolor=#C2FFFF
| 381409 ||  || — || April 13, 2008 || Mount Lemmon || Mount Lemmon Survey || L5 || align=right | 14 km || 
|-id=410 bgcolor=#fefefe
| 381410 ||  || — || April 30, 2008 || Kitt Peak || Spacewatch || — || align=right data-sort-value="0.76" | 760 m || 
|-id=411 bgcolor=#fefefe
| 381411 ||  || — || May 2, 2008 || Kitt Peak || Spacewatch || V || align=right data-sort-value="0.71" | 710 m || 
|-id=412 bgcolor=#fefefe
| 381412 ||  || — || May 3, 2008 || Kitt Peak || Spacewatch || NYS || align=right data-sort-value="0.66" | 660 m || 
|-id=413 bgcolor=#fefefe
| 381413 ||  || — || May 7, 2008 || Kitt Peak || Spacewatch || — || align=right | 1.2 km || 
|-id=414 bgcolor=#E9E9E9
| 381414 ||  || — || May 3, 2008 || Mount Lemmon || Mount Lemmon Survey || — || align=right data-sort-value="0.84" | 840 m || 
|-id=415 bgcolor=#C2FFFF
| 381415 ||  || — || May 27, 2008 || Kitt Peak || Spacewatch || L5 || align=right | 7.7 km || 
|-id=416 bgcolor=#fefefe
| 381416 ||  || — || May 27, 2008 || Kitt Peak || Spacewatch || — || align=right | 1.1 km || 
|-id=417 bgcolor=#C2FFFF
| 381417 ||  || — || May 29, 2008 || Mount Lemmon || Mount Lemmon Survey || L5 || align=right | 10 km || 
|-id=418 bgcolor=#fefefe
| 381418 ||  || — || May 29, 2008 || Kitt Peak || Spacewatch || — || align=right data-sort-value="0.97" | 970 m || 
|-id=419 bgcolor=#C2FFFF
| 381419 ||  || — || May 29, 2008 || Kitt Peak || Spacewatch || L5 || align=right | 12 km || 
|-id=420 bgcolor=#C2FFFF
| 381420 ||  || — || June 1, 2008 || Kitt Peak || Spacewatch || L5 || align=right | 11 km || 
|-id=421 bgcolor=#fefefe
| 381421 ||  || — || June 6, 2008 || Kitt Peak || Spacewatch || — || align=right data-sort-value="0.94" | 940 m || 
|-id=422 bgcolor=#C2FFFF
| 381422 ||  || — || June 7, 2008 || Kitt Peak || Spacewatch || L5 || align=right | 15 km || 
|-id=423 bgcolor=#E9E9E9
| 381423 ||  || — || June 4, 2008 || Mount Lemmon || Mount Lemmon Survey || — || align=right data-sort-value="0.80" | 800 m || 
|-id=424 bgcolor=#E9E9E9
| 381424 ||  || — || June 29, 2008 || Siding Spring || SSS || 526 || align=right | 3.3 km || 
|-id=425 bgcolor=#E9E9E9
| 381425 ||  || — || July 10, 2008 || La Sagra || OAM Obs. || — || align=right | 1.4 km || 
|-id=426 bgcolor=#E9E9E9
| 381426 ||  || — || July 30, 2008 || Catalina || CSS || JUN || align=right | 1.5 km || 
|-id=427 bgcolor=#E9E9E9
| 381427 ||  || — || July 29, 2008 || La Sagra || OAM Obs. || — || align=right data-sort-value="0.91" | 910 m || 
|-id=428 bgcolor=#E9E9E9
| 381428 ||  || — || July 30, 2008 || Kitt Peak || Spacewatch || — || align=right | 2.0 km || 
|-id=429 bgcolor=#E9E9E9
| 381429 ||  || — || July 30, 2008 || Kitt Peak || Spacewatch || — || align=right | 2.1 km || 
|-id=430 bgcolor=#E9E9E9
| 381430 ||  || — || July 30, 2008 || Kitt Peak || Spacewatch || — || align=right | 2.6 km || 
|-id=431 bgcolor=#E9E9E9
| 381431 ||  || — || August 5, 2008 || Cerro Burek || Alianza S4 Obs. || BRU || align=right | 2.9 km || 
|-id=432 bgcolor=#E9E9E9
| 381432 ||  || — || August 10, 2008 || Dauban || F. Kugel || — || align=right | 1.3 km || 
|-id=433 bgcolor=#E9E9E9
| 381433 ||  || — || August 10, 2008 || Vicques || M. Ory || KON || align=right | 3.2 km || 
|-id=434 bgcolor=#E9E9E9
| 381434 ||  || — || August 7, 2008 || Kitt Peak || Spacewatch || — || align=right | 1.2 km || 
|-id=435 bgcolor=#E9E9E9
| 381435 ||  || — || August 20, 2008 || Kitt Peak || Spacewatch || AER || align=right | 1.6 km || 
|-id=436 bgcolor=#E9E9E9
| 381436 ||  || — || August 22, 2008 || Kitt Peak || Spacewatch || GEF || align=right | 1.4 km || 
|-id=437 bgcolor=#E9E9E9
| 381437 ||  || — || August 25, 2008 || La Sagra || OAM Obs. || MIS || align=right | 2.9 km || 
|-id=438 bgcolor=#E9E9E9
| 381438 ||  || — || August 26, 2008 || La Sagra || OAM Obs. || NEM || align=right | 2.7 km || 
|-id=439 bgcolor=#E9E9E9
| 381439 ||  || — || August 26, 2008 || La Sagra || OAM Obs. || — || align=right | 2.4 km || 
|-id=440 bgcolor=#E9E9E9
| 381440 ||  || — || August 26, 2008 || La Sagra || OAM Obs. || GEF || align=right | 1.6 km || 
|-id=441 bgcolor=#E9E9E9
| 381441 ||  || — || August 25, 2008 || La Sagra || OAM Obs. || MAR || align=right | 1.5 km || 
|-id=442 bgcolor=#E9E9E9
| 381442 ||  || — || August 30, 2008 || Socorro || LINEAR || — || align=right | 3.8 km || 
|-id=443 bgcolor=#E9E9E9
| 381443 ||  || — || August 30, 2008 || Socorro || LINEAR || — || align=right | 2.7 km || 
|-id=444 bgcolor=#E9E9E9
| 381444 ||  || — || August 30, 2008 || Uccle || T. Pauwels, E. W. Elst || — || align=right | 1.9 km || 
|-id=445 bgcolor=#E9E9E9
| 381445 ||  || — || August 30, 2008 || Altschwendt || W. Ries || MAR || align=right | 1.4 km || 
|-id=446 bgcolor=#E9E9E9
| 381446 ||  || — || August 24, 2008 || Socorro || LINEAR || ADE || align=right | 2.0 km || 
|-id=447 bgcolor=#E9E9E9
| 381447 ||  || — || September 4, 2008 || Kitt Peak || Spacewatch || PAD || align=right | 2.5 km || 
|-id=448 bgcolor=#E9E9E9
| 381448 ||  || — || September 4, 2008 || Kitt Peak || Spacewatch || MRX || align=right | 1.0 km || 
|-id=449 bgcolor=#E9E9E9
| 381449 ||  || — || September 4, 2008 || Kitt Peak || Spacewatch || HOF || align=right | 2.9 km || 
|-id=450 bgcolor=#E9E9E9
| 381450 ||  || — || September 4, 2008 || Kitt Peak || Spacewatch || — || align=right | 2.2 km || 
|-id=451 bgcolor=#E9E9E9
| 381451 ||  || — || September 2, 2008 || Kitt Peak || Spacewatch || WIT || align=right | 1.1 km || 
|-id=452 bgcolor=#E9E9E9
| 381452 ||  || — || September 3, 2008 || Kitt Peak || Spacewatch || — || align=right | 2.5 km || 
|-id=453 bgcolor=#E9E9E9
| 381453 ||  || — || September 8, 2008 || Taunus || R. Kling, U. Zimmer || — || align=right | 2.0 km || 
|-id=454 bgcolor=#E9E9E9
| 381454 ||  || — || September 2, 2008 || Kitt Peak || Spacewatch || HEN || align=right | 1.0 km || 
|-id=455 bgcolor=#E9E9E9
| 381455 ||  || — || September 2, 2008 || Kitt Peak || Spacewatch || — || align=right | 1.7 km || 
|-id=456 bgcolor=#E9E9E9
| 381456 ||  || — || September 2, 2008 || Kitt Peak || Spacewatch || — || align=right | 2.0 km || 
|-id=457 bgcolor=#E9E9E9
| 381457 ||  || — || September 3, 2008 || Kitt Peak || Spacewatch || — || align=right | 2.6 km || 
|-id=458 bgcolor=#E9E9E9
| 381458 Moiseenko ||  ||  || September 2, 2008 || Zelenchukskaya || Zelenchukskaya Stn. || — || align=right | 1.9 km || 
|-id=459 bgcolor=#E9E9E9
| 381459 ||  || — || September 4, 2008 || Kitt Peak || Spacewatch || — || align=right | 1.4 km || 
|-id=460 bgcolor=#E9E9E9
| 381460 ||  || — || September 5, 2008 || Kitt Peak || Spacewatch || — || align=right | 2.8 km || 
|-id=461 bgcolor=#E9E9E9
| 381461 ||  || — || September 7, 2008 || Mount Lemmon || Mount Lemmon Survey || — || align=right data-sort-value="0.77" | 770 m || 
|-id=462 bgcolor=#E9E9E9
| 381462 ||  || — || September 5, 2008 || Kitt Peak || Spacewatch || WIT || align=right data-sort-value="0.92" | 920 m || 
|-id=463 bgcolor=#E9E9E9
| 381463 ||  || — || September 6, 2008 || Mount Lemmon || Mount Lemmon Survey || HOF || align=right | 2.2 km || 
|-id=464 bgcolor=#d6d6d6
| 381464 ||  || — || September 6, 2008 || Mount Lemmon || Mount Lemmon Survey || BRA || align=right | 1.3 km || 
|-id=465 bgcolor=#E9E9E9
| 381465 ||  || — || September 7, 2008 || Mount Lemmon || Mount Lemmon Survey || — || align=right | 1.7 km || 
|-id=466 bgcolor=#E9E9E9
| 381466 ||  || — || September 9, 2008 || Mount Lemmon || Mount Lemmon Survey || HOF || align=right | 2.3 km || 
|-id=467 bgcolor=#E9E9E9
| 381467 ||  || — || September 4, 2008 || Kitt Peak || Spacewatch || — || align=right | 1.9 km || 
|-id=468 bgcolor=#E9E9E9
| 381468 ||  || — || September 6, 2008 || Kitt Peak || Spacewatch || MIS || align=right | 3.1 km || 
|-id=469 bgcolor=#d6d6d6
| 381469 ||  || — || September 9, 2008 || Mount Lemmon || Mount Lemmon Survey || KAR || align=right | 1.2 km || 
|-id=470 bgcolor=#d6d6d6
| 381470 ||  || — || September 8, 2008 || Catalina || CSS || BRA || align=right | 1.9 km || 
|-id=471 bgcolor=#E9E9E9
| 381471 ||  || — || September 5, 2008 || Socorro || LINEAR || — || align=right | 1.8 km || 
|-id=472 bgcolor=#E9E9E9
| 381472 ||  || — || September 5, 2008 || Kitt Peak || Spacewatch || WIT || align=right | 1.0 km || 
|-id=473 bgcolor=#E9E9E9
| 381473 ||  || — || September 7, 2008 || Mount Lemmon || Mount Lemmon Survey || — || align=right | 1.6 km || 
|-id=474 bgcolor=#E9E9E9
| 381474 ||  || — || September 22, 2008 || Socorro || LINEAR || MRX || align=right | 1.3 km || 
|-id=475 bgcolor=#E9E9E9
| 381475 ||  || — || September 22, 2008 || Socorro || LINEAR || — || align=right | 2.3 km || 
|-id=476 bgcolor=#E9E9E9
| 381476 ||  || — || September 19, 2008 || Kitt Peak || Spacewatch || CLO || align=right | 1.6 km || 
|-id=477 bgcolor=#E9E9E9
| 381477 ||  || — || September 20, 2008 || Kitt Peak || Spacewatch || — || align=right | 3.8 km || 
|-id=478 bgcolor=#E9E9E9
| 381478 ||  || — || September 20, 2008 || Kitt Peak || Spacewatch || WIT || align=right | 1.2 km || 
|-id=479 bgcolor=#E9E9E9
| 381479 ||  || — || September 20, 2008 || Kitt Peak || Spacewatch || — || align=right | 2.3 km || 
|-id=480 bgcolor=#E9E9E9
| 381480 ||  || — || September 20, 2008 || Kitt Peak || Spacewatch || — || align=right | 2.3 km || 
|-id=481 bgcolor=#E9E9E9
| 381481 ||  || — || September 20, 2008 || Catalina || CSS || — || align=right | 3.4 km || 
|-id=482 bgcolor=#E9E9E9
| 381482 ||  || — || September 21, 2008 || Kitt Peak || Spacewatch || — || align=right | 2.2 km || 
|-id=483 bgcolor=#E9E9E9
| 381483 ||  || — || September 21, 2008 || Catalina || CSS || — || align=right | 3.3 km || 
|-id=484 bgcolor=#E9E9E9
| 381484 ||  || — || September 22, 2008 || Kitt Peak || Spacewatch || — || align=right | 1.2 km || 
|-id=485 bgcolor=#E9E9E9
| 381485 ||  || — || September 22, 2008 || Mount Lemmon || Mount Lemmon Survey || — || align=right | 2.4 km || 
|-id=486 bgcolor=#E9E9E9
| 381486 ||  || — || September 22, 2008 || Goodricke-Pigott || R. A. Tucker || — || align=right | 2.0 km || 
|-id=487 bgcolor=#E9E9E9
| 381487 ||  || — || September 23, 2008 || Mount Lemmon || Mount Lemmon Survey || — || align=right | 1.2 km || 
|-id=488 bgcolor=#E9E9E9
| 381488 ||  || — || September 25, 2008 || Hibiscus || S. F. Hönig, N. Teamo || — || align=right | 2.8 km || 
|-id=489 bgcolor=#E9E9E9
| 381489 ||  || — || September 28, 2008 || Prairie Grass || J. Mahony || — || align=right | 1.7 km || 
|-id=490 bgcolor=#d6d6d6
| 381490 ||  || — || September 20, 2008 || Kitt Peak || Spacewatch || — || align=right | 2.4 km || 
|-id=491 bgcolor=#E9E9E9
| 381491 ||  || — || September 20, 2008 || Catalina || CSS || — || align=right | 2.0 km || 
|-id=492 bgcolor=#E9E9E9
| 381492 ||  || — || September 21, 2008 || Kitt Peak || Spacewatch || HOF || align=right | 2.5 km || 
|-id=493 bgcolor=#E9E9E9
| 381493 ||  || — || September 21, 2008 || Kitt Peak || Spacewatch || — || align=right | 2.2 km || 
|-id=494 bgcolor=#E9E9E9
| 381494 ||  || — || September 21, 2008 || Kitt Peak || Spacewatch || — || align=right | 3.1 km || 
|-id=495 bgcolor=#E9E9E9
| 381495 ||  || — || September 21, 2008 || Mount Lemmon || Mount Lemmon Survey || HEN || align=right | 1.3 km || 
|-id=496 bgcolor=#E9E9E9
| 381496 ||  || — || September 22, 2008 || Mount Lemmon || Mount Lemmon Survey || — || align=right | 2.4 km || 
|-id=497 bgcolor=#d6d6d6
| 381497 ||  || — || September 22, 2008 || Kitt Peak || Spacewatch || — || align=right | 2.0 km || 
|-id=498 bgcolor=#E9E9E9
| 381498 ||  || — || September 22, 2008 || Mount Lemmon || Mount Lemmon Survey || HOF || align=right | 2.6 km || 
|-id=499 bgcolor=#E9E9E9
| 381499 ||  || — || September 22, 2008 || Mount Lemmon || Mount Lemmon Survey || HEN || align=right | 1.2 km || 
|-id=500 bgcolor=#E9E9E9
| 381500 ||  || — || September 22, 2008 || Mount Lemmon || Mount Lemmon Survey || — || align=right | 3.3 km || 
|}

381501–381600 

|-bgcolor=#E9E9E9
| 381501 ||  || — || September 22, 2008 || Mount Lemmon || Mount Lemmon Survey || — || align=right | 2.2 km || 
|-id=502 bgcolor=#E9E9E9
| 381502 ||  || — || September 22, 2008 || Mount Lemmon || Mount Lemmon Survey || HOF || align=right | 2.2 km || 
|-id=503 bgcolor=#E9E9E9
| 381503 ||  || — || September 22, 2008 || Mount Lemmon || Mount Lemmon Survey || — || align=right | 2.9 km || 
|-id=504 bgcolor=#E9E9E9
| 381504 ||  || — || September 22, 2008 || Kitt Peak || Spacewatch || — || align=right | 2.4 km || 
|-id=505 bgcolor=#d6d6d6
| 381505 ||  || — || September 22, 2008 || Kitt Peak || Spacewatch || CHA || align=right | 1.9 km || 
|-id=506 bgcolor=#E9E9E9
| 381506 ||  || — || September 24, 2008 || Mount Lemmon || Mount Lemmon Survey || — || align=right | 2.1 km || 
|-id=507 bgcolor=#E9E9E9
| 381507 ||  || — || September 24, 2008 || Catalina || CSS || — || align=right | 3.4 km || 
|-id=508 bgcolor=#E9E9E9
| 381508 ||  || — || September 22, 2008 || Bisei SG Center || BATTeRS || — || align=right | 4.3 km || 
|-id=509 bgcolor=#E9E9E9
| 381509 ||  || — || September 23, 2008 || Socorro || LINEAR || — || align=right | 2.1 km || 
|-id=510 bgcolor=#E9E9E9
| 381510 ||  || — || September 28, 2008 || Socorro || LINEAR || DOR || align=right | 2.7 km || 
|-id=511 bgcolor=#E9E9E9
| 381511 ||  || — || September 22, 2008 || Kitt Peak || Spacewatch || — || align=right | 2.8 km || 
|-id=512 bgcolor=#E9E9E9
| 381512 ||  || — || September 21, 2008 || Catalina || CSS || — || align=right | 1.8 km || 
|-id=513 bgcolor=#E9E9E9
| 381513 ||  || — || September 22, 2008 || Mount Lemmon || Mount Lemmon Survey || — || align=right | 2.1 km || 
|-id=514 bgcolor=#E9E9E9
| 381514 ||  || — || September 22, 2008 || Catalina || CSS || GEF || align=right | 1.5 km || 
|-id=515 bgcolor=#E9E9E9
| 381515 ||  || — || September 23, 2008 || Kitt Peak || Spacewatch || — || align=right | 2.0 km || 
|-id=516 bgcolor=#E9E9E9
| 381516 ||  || — || September 24, 2008 || Kitt Peak || Spacewatch || — || align=right | 2.7 km || 
|-id=517 bgcolor=#E9E9E9
| 381517 ||  || — || September 25, 2008 || Mount Lemmon || Mount Lemmon Survey || — || align=right | 2.9 km || 
|-id=518 bgcolor=#E9E9E9
| 381518 ||  || — || September 25, 2008 || Kitt Peak || Spacewatch || — || align=right | 2.6 km || 
|-id=519 bgcolor=#E9E9E9
| 381519 ||  || — || September 25, 2008 || Kitt Peak || Spacewatch || HOF || align=right | 2.8 km || 
|-id=520 bgcolor=#E9E9E9
| 381520 ||  || — || September 25, 2008 || Kitt Peak || Spacewatch || HOF || align=right | 2.9 km || 
|-id=521 bgcolor=#E9E9E9
| 381521 ||  || — || September 29, 2008 || Kitt Peak || Spacewatch || — || align=right | 2.6 km || 
|-id=522 bgcolor=#E9E9E9
| 381522 ||  || — || September 30, 2008 || La Sagra || OAM Obs. || ADE || align=right | 3.6 km || 
|-id=523 bgcolor=#E9E9E9
| 381523 ||  || — || September 30, 2008 || La Sagra || OAM Obs. || NEM || align=right | 2.3 km || 
|-id=524 bgcolor=#E9E9E9
| 381524 ||  || — || September 25, 2008 || Mount Lemmon || Mount Lemmon Survey || — || align=right | 2.3 km || 
|-id=525 bgcolor=#E9E9E9
| 381525 ||  || — || September 28, 2008 || Mount Lemmon || Mount Lemmon Survey || WIT || align=right | 1.0 km || 
|-id=526 bgcolor=#E9E9E9
| 381526 ||  || — || September 28, 2008 || Mount Lemmon || Mount Lemmon Survey || DOR || align=right | 3.0 km || 
|-id=527 bgcolor=#E9E9E9
| 381527 ||  || — || September 5, 2008 || Kitt Peak || Spacewatch || — || align=right | 1.5 km || 
|-id=528 bgcolor=#E9E9E9
| 381528 ||  || — || September 29, 2008 || Kitt Peak || Spacewatch || — || align=right | 2.0 km || 
|-id=529 bgcolor=#E9E9E9
| 381529 ||  || — || September 23, 2008 || Kitt Peak || Spacewatch || — || align=right | 3.1 km || 
|-id=530 bgcolor=#E9E9E9
| 381530 ||  || — || September 22, 2008 || Kitt Peak || Spacewatch || — || align=right | 2.5 km || 
|-id=531 bgcolor=#E9E9E9
| 381531 ||  || — || September 24, 2008 || Kitt Peak || Spacewatch || HOF || align=right | 2.6 km || 
|-id=532 bgcolor=#E9E9E9
| 381532 ||  || — || September 23, 2008 || Kitt Peak || Spacewatch || HOF || align=right | 2.6 km || 
|-id=533 bgcolor=#E9E9E9
| 381533 ||  || — || September 22, 2008 || Catalina || CSS || — || align=right | 3.3 km || 
|-id=534 bgcolor=#E9E9E9
| 381534 ||  || — || September 23, 2008 || Mount Lemmon || Mount Lemmon Survey || HOF || align=right | 3.3 km || 
|-id=535 bgcolor=#E9E9E9
| 381535 ||  || — || September 22, 2008 || Catalina || CSS || — || align=right | 3.3 km || 
|-id=536 bgcolor=#E9E9E9
| 381536 ||  || — || September 22, 2008 || Socorro || LINEAR || — || align=right | 3.5 km || 
|-id=537 bgcolor=#E9E9E9
| 381537 ||  || — || September 23, 2008 || Kitt Peak || Spacewatch || GEF || align=right | 1.4 km || 
|-id=538 bgcolor=#E9E9E9
| 381538 ||  || — || September 23, 2008 || Socorro || LINEAR || — || align=right | 2.8 km || 
|-id=539 bgcolor=#E9E9E9
| 381539 ||  || — || September 23, 2008 || Mount Lemmon || Mount Lemmon Survey || — || align=right | 1.6 km || 
|-id=540 bgcolor=#E9E9E9
| 381540 ||  || — || September 24, 2008 || Mount Lemmon || Mount Lemmon Survey || — || align=right | 2.1 km || 
|-id=541 bgcolor=#E9E9E9
| 381541 ||  || — || September 24, 2008 || Mount Lemmon || Mount Lemmon Survey || — || align=right | 2.2 km || 
|-id=542 bgcolor=#E9E9E9
| 381542 ||  || — || September 29, 2008 || Kitt Peak || Spacewatch || — || align=right | 3.8 km || 
|-id=543 bgcolor=#E9E9E9
| 381543 ||  || — || September 30, 2008 || Socorro || LINEAR || — || align=right | 1.9 km || 
|-id=544 bgcolor=#E9E9E9
| 381544 ||  || — || October 1, 2008 || Socorro || LINEAR || — || align=right | 2.8 km || 
|-id=545 bgcolor=#E9E9E9
| 381545 ||  || — || October 1, 2008 || La Sagra || OAM Obs. || — || align=right | 3.0 km || 
|-id=546 bgcolor=#E9E9E9
| 381546 ||  || — || October 1, 2008 || Mount Lemmon || Mount Lemmon Survey || — || align=right | 3.0 km || 
|-id=547 bgcolor=#E9E9E9
| 381547 ||  || — || October 9, 2004 || Kitt Peak || Spacewatch || — || align=right | 1.6 km || 
|-id=548 bgcolor=#E9E9E9
| 381548 ||  || — || October 1, 2008 || Mount Lemmon || Mount Lemmon Survey || — || align=right | 3.4 km || 
|-id=549 bgcolor=#E9E9E9
| 381549 ||  || — || October 2, 2008 || Kitt Peak || Spacewatch || — || align=right | 2.2 km || 
|-id=550 bgcolor=#E9E9E9
| 381550 ||  || — || September 22, 2008 || Kitt Peak || Spacewatch || AGN || align=right | 1.1 km || 
|-id=551 bgcolor=#E9E9E9
| 381551 ||  || — || September 6, 2008 || Mount Lemmon || Mount Lemmon Survey || — || align=right | 1.3 km || 
|-id=552 bgcolor=#E9E9E9
| 381552 ||  || — || October 2, 2008 || Kitt Peak || Spacewatch || — || align=right | 2.6 km || 
|-id=553 bgcolor=#E9E9E9
| 381553 ||  || — || October 2, 2008 || Mount Lemmon || Mount Lemmon Survey || — || align=right | 2.1 km || 
|-id=554 bgcolor=#E9E9E9
| 381554 ||  || — || September 25, 2008 || Kitt Peak || Spacewatch || HNS || align=right | 1.3 km || 
|-id=555 bgcolor=#E9E9E9
| 381555 ||  || — || October 6, 2008 || Kitt Peak || Spacewatch || HEN || align=right data-sort-value="0.98" | 980 m || 
|-id=556 bgcolor=#E9E9E9
| 381556 ||  || — || October 6, 2008 || Kitt Peak || Spacewatch || WIT || align=right | 1.00 km || 
|-id=557 bgcolor=#E9E9E9
| 381557 ||  || — || October 6, 2008 || Kitt Peak || Spacewatch || — || align=right | 1.9 km || 
|-id=558 bgcolor=#E9E9E9
| 381558 ||  || — || September 21, 2008 || Catalina || CSS || — || align=right | 3.6 km || 
|-id=559 bgcolor=#E9E9E9
| 381559 ||  || — || October 6, 2008 || Kitt Peak || Spacewatch || — || align=right | 2.4 km || 
|-id=560 bgcolor=#E9E9E9
| 381560 ||  || — || October 6, 2008 || Catalina || CSS || — || align=right | 2.5 km || 
|-id=561 bgcolor=#E9E9E9
| 381561 ||  || — || October 9, 2008 || Mount Lemmon || Mount Lemmon Survey || — || align=right | 2.2 km || 
|-id=562 bgcolor=#d6d6d6
| 381562 ||  || — || October 1, 2008 || Mount Lemmon || Mount Lemmon Survey || KOR || align=right | 1.1 km || 
|-id=563 bgcolor=#E9E9E9
| 381563 ||  || — || October 9, 2008 || Kitt Peak || Spacewatch || — || align=right | 1.8 km || 
|-id=564 bgcolor=#FFC2E0
| 381564 ||  || — || October 25, 2008 || Modra || Modra Obs. || AMO +1km || align=right data-sort-value="0.79" | 790 m || 
|-id=565 bgcolor=#E9E9E9
| 381565 ||  || — || October 17, 2008 || Kitt Peak || Spacewatch || HEN || align=right | 1.1 km || 
|-id=566 bgcolor=#E9E9E9
| 381566 ||  || — || October 21, 2008 || Kitt Peak || Spacewatch || MRX || align=right | 1.3 km || 
|-id=567 bgcolor=#E9E9E9
| 381567 ||  || — || September 5, 2008 || Kitt Peak || Spacewatch || — || align=right | 1.7 km || 
|-id=568 bgcolor=#E9E9E9
| 381568 ||  || — || September 23, 2008 || Kitt Peak || Spacewatch || — || align=right | 2.5 km || 
|-id=569 bgcolor=#E9E9E9
| 381569 ||  || — || October 22, 2008 || Kitt Peak || Spacewatch || — || align=right | 3.1 km || 
|-id=570 bgcolor=#d6d6d6
| 381570 ||  || — || October 24, 2008 || Socorro || LINEAR || FIR || align=right | 4.6 km || 
|-id=571 bgcolor=#E9E9E9
| 381571 ||  || — || October 27, 2008 || Bisei SG Center || BATTeRS || — || align=right | 2.1 km || 
|-id=572 bgcolor=#E9E9E9
| 381572 ||  || — || October 22, 2008 || Kitt Peak || Spacewatch || PAD || align=right | 1.5 km || 
|-id=573 bgcolor=#E9E9E9
| 381573 ||  || — || October 22, 2008 || Mount Lemmon || Mount Lemmon Survey || WIT || align=right | 1.0 km || 
|-id=574 bgcolor=#d6d6d6
| 381574 ||  || — || October 22, 2008 || Kitt Peak || Spacewatch || — || align=right | 2.4 km || 
|-id=575 bgcolor=#E9E9E9
| 381575 ||  || — || October 23, 2008 || Mount Lemmon || Mount Lemmon Survey || — || align=right | 2.0 km || 
|-id=576 bgcolor=#E9E9E9
| 381576 ||  || — || October 23, 2008 || Mount Lemmon || Mount Lemmon Survey || HEN || align=right data-sort-value="0.98" | 980 m || 
|-id=577 bgcolor=#E9E9E9
| 381577 ||  || — || October 24, 2008 || Mount Lemmon || Mount Lemmon Survey || — || align=right | 2.3 km || 
|-id=578 bgcolor=#E9E9E9
| 381578 ||  || — || October 25, 2008 || Mount Lemmon || Mount Lemmon Survey || — || align=right | 2.9 km || 
|-id=579 bgcolor=#d6d6d6
| 381579 ||  || — || October 28, 2008 || Socorro || LINEAR || Tj (2.96) || align=right | 3.7 km || 
|-id=580 bgcolor=#E9E9E9
| 381580 ||  || — || December 12, 2004 || Kitt Peak || Spacewatch || WIT || align=right | 1.3 km || 
|-id=581 bgcolor=#E9E9E9
| 381581 ||  || — || October 23, 2008 || Lulin || LUSS || XIZ || align=right | 1.6 km || 
|-id=582 bgcolor=#E9E9E9
| 381582 ||  || — || October 26, 2008 || Mount Lemmon || Mount Lemmon Survey || — || align=right | 1.8 km || 
|-id=583 bgcolor=#E9E9E9
| 381583 ||  || — || October 26, 2008 || Kitt Peak || Spacewatch || — || align=right | 2.8 km || 
|-id=584 bgcolor=#E9E9E9
| 381584 ||  || — || October 27, 2008 || Kitt Peak || Spacewatch || — || align=right | 2.3 km || 
|-id=585 bgcolor=#d6d6d6
| 381585 ||  || — || October 27, 2008 || Kitt Peak || Spacewatch || — || align=right | 2.6 km || 
|-id=586 bgcolor=#E9E9E9
| 381586 ||  || — || October 29, 2008 || Kitt Peak || Spacewatch || — || align=right | 2.6 km || 
|-id=587 bgcolor=#E9E9E9
| 381587 ||  || — || October 31, 2008 || Mount Lemmon || Mount Lemmon Survey || — || align=right | 2.0 km || 
|-id=588 bgcolor=#d6d6d6
| 381588 ||  || — || October 31, 2008 || Mount Lemmon || Mount Lemmon Survey || — || align=right | 3.4 km || 
|-id=589 bgcolor=#FA8072
| 381589 ||  || — || October 20, 2008 || Mount Lemmon || Mount Lemmon Survey || H || align=right data-sort-value="0.63" | 630 m || 
|-id=590 bgcolor=#d6d6d6
| 381590 ||  || — || October 20, 2008 || Kitt Peak || Spacewatch || KAR || align=right | 1.2 km || 
|-id=591 bgcolor=#d6d6d6
| 381591 ||  || — || October 25, 2008 || Kitt Peak || Spacewatch || — || align=right | 2.9 km || 
|-id=592 bgcolor=#E9E9E9
| 381592 ||  || — || October 22, 2008 || Kitt Peak || Spacewatch || — || align=right | 2.6 km || 
|-id=593 bgcolor=#E9E9E9
| 381593 ||  || — || October 24, 2008 || Catalina || CSS || — || align=right | 2.8 km || 
|-id=594 bgcolor=#d6d6d6
| 381594 ||  || — || October 23, 2008 || Kitt Peak || Spacewatch || — || align=right | 2.2 km || 
|-id=595 bgcolor=#d6d6d6
| 381595 ||  || — || October 30, 2008 || Mount Lemmon || Mount Lemmon Survey || — || align=right | 4.1 km || 
|-id=596 bgcolor=#E9E9E9
| 381596 ||  || — || November 6, 2008 || Hibiscus || N. Teamo || — || align=right | 2.4 km || 
|-id=597 bgcolor=#E9E9E9
| 381597 ||  || — || November 2, 2008 || Mount Lemmon || Mount Lemmon Survey || GEF || align=right | 1.4 km || 
|-id=598 bgcolor=#E9E9E9
| 381598 ||  || — || November 2, 2008 || Kitt Peak || Spacewatch || NEM || align=right | 2.1 km || 
|-id=599 bgcolor=#d6d6d6
| 381599 ||  || — || November 4, 2008 || Kitt Peak || Spacewatch || — || align=right | 4.1 km || 
|-id=600 bgcolor=#d6d6d6
| 381600 ||  || — || November 1, 2008 || Mount Lemmon || Mount Lemmon Survey || — || align=right | 5.6 km || 
|}

381601–381700 

|-bgcolor=#d6d6d6
| 381601 ||  || — || November 1, 2008 || Mount Lemmon || Mount Lemmon Survey || CHA || align=right | 2.2 km || 
|-id=602 bgcolor=#d6d6d6
| 381602 ||  || — || November 1, 2008 || Kitt Peak || Spacewatch || EUP || align=right | 5.0 km || 
|-id=603 bgcolor=#d6d6d6
| 381603 ||  || — || November 6, 2008 || Kitt Peak || Spacewatch || — || align=right | 3.6 km || 
|-id=604 bgcolor=#d6d6d6
| 381604 ||  || — || November 26, 2003 || Kitt Peak || Spacewatch || EOS || align=right | 2.1 km || 
|-id=605 bgcolor=#d6d6d6
| 381605 ||  || — || November 17, 2008 || Kitt Peak || Spacewatch || KOR || align=right | 1.1 km || 
|-id=606 bgcolor=#d6d6d6
| 381606 ||  || — || November 18, 2008 || Catalina || CSS || — || align=right | 3.2 km || 
|-id=607 bgcolor=#d6d6d6
| 381607 ||  || — || September 22, 2008 || Mount Lemmon || Mount Lemmon Survey || — || align=right | 2.5 km || 
|-id=608 bgcolor=#d6d6d6
| 381608 ||  || — || November 17, 2008 || Kitt Peak || Spacewatch || TRE || align=right | 3.2 km || 
|-id=609 bgcolor=#d6d6d6
| 381609 ||  || — || November 18, 2008 || Kitt Peak || Spacewatch || KOR || align=right | 1.5 km || 
|-id=610 bgcolor=#d6d6d6
| 381610 ||  || — || November 19, 2008 || Kitt Peak || Spacewatch || — || align=right | 2.2 km || 
|-id=611 bgcolor=#E9E9E9
| 381611 ||  || — || September 7, 2008 || Catalina || CSS || — || align=right | 2.6 km || 
|-id=612 bgcolor=#d6d6d6
| 381612 ||  || — || November 20, 2008 || Kitt Peak || Spacewatch || — || align=right | 2.1 km || 
|-id=613 bgcolor=#d6d6d6
| 381613 ||  || — || November 20, 2008 || Kitt Peak || Spacewatch || — || align=right | 3.0 km || 
|-id=614 bgcolor=#d6d6d6
| 381614 ||  || — || November 20, 2008 || Kitt Peak || Spacewatch || EOS || align=right | 1.9 km || 
|-id=615 bgcolor=#E9E9E9
| 381615 ||  || — || November 20, 2008 || Kitt Peak || Spacewatch || — || align=right | 1.6 km || 
|-id=616 bgcolor=#d6d6d6
| 381616 ||  || — || November 21, 2008 || Kitt Peak || Spacewatch || KOR || align=right | 1.3 km || 
|-id=617 bgcolor=#d6d6d6
| 381617 ||  || — || November 30, 2008 || Kitt Peak || Spacewatch || — || align=right | 2.8 km || 
|-id=618 bgcolor=#d6d6d6
| 381618 ||  || — || November 30, 2008 || Kitt Peak || Spacewatch || EOS || align=right | 1.9 km || 
|-id=619 bgcolor=#d6d6d6
| 381619 ||  || — || November 21, 2008 || Kitt Peak || Spacewatch || — || align=right | 2.3 km || 
|-id=620 bgcolor=#d6d6d6
| 381620 ||  || — || November 19, 2008 || Kitt Peak || Spacewatch || — || align=right | 3.5 km || 
|-id=621 bgcolor=#E9E9E9
| 381621 ||  || — || November 17, 2008 || Catalina || CSS || EUN || align=right | 1.3 km || 
|-id=622 bgcolor=#d6d6d6
| 381622 ||  || — || December 2, 2008 || Bisei SG Center || BATTeRS || — || align=right | 2.6 km || 
|-id=623 bgcolor=#d6d6d6
| 381623 ||  || — || September 7, 2008 || Mount Lemmon || Mount Lemmon Survey || — || align=right | 3.2 km || 
|-id=624 bgcolor=#d6d6d6
| 381624 ||  || — || December 7, 2008 || Mount Lemmon || Mount Lemmon Survey || — || align=right | 3.9 km || 
|-id=625 bgcolor=#d6d6d6
| 381625 ||  || — || December 7, 2008 || Mount Lemmon || Mount Lemmon Survey || — || align=right | 4.3 km || 
|-id=626 bgcolor=#d6d6d6
| 381626 ||  || — || December 17, 2008 || Bisei SG Center || BATTeRS || — || align=right | 4.1 km || 
|-id=627 bgcolor=#d6d6d6
| 381627 ||  || — || December 22, 2008 || Dauban || F. Kugel || — || align=right | 4.5 km || 
|-id=628 bgcolor=#d6d6d6
| 381628 ||  || — || December 21, 2008 || Mount Lemmon || Mount Lemmon Survey || — || align=right | 2.9 km || 
|-id=629 bgcolor=#d6d6d6
| 381629 ||  || — || December 21, 2008 || Mount Lemmon || Mount Lemmon Survey || — || align=right | 5.4 km || 
|-id=630 bgcolor=#d6d6d6
| 381630 ||  || — || December 23, 2008 || Bisei SG Center || BATTeRS || — || align=right | 4.1 km || 
|-id=631 bgcolor=#d6d6d6
| 381631 ||  || — || December 21, 2008 || Socorro || LINEAR || — || align=right | 3.1 km || 
|-id=632 bgcolor=#fefefe
| 381632 ||  || — || December 21, 2008 || Catalina || CSS || H || align=right data-sort-value="0.74" | 740 m || 
|-id=633 bgcolor=#d6d6d6
| 381633 ||  || — || December 29, 2008 || Kitt Peak || Spacewatch || THM || align=right | 1.8 km || 
|-id=634 bgcolor=#d6d6d6
| 381634 ||  || — || December 29, 2008 || Mount Lemmon || Mount Lemmon Survey || — || align=right | 2.1 km || 
|-id=635 bgcolor=#d6d6d6
| 381635 ||  || — || December 29, 2008 || Kitt Peak || Spacewatch || — || align=right | 2.6 km || 
|-id=636 bgcolor=#d6d6d6
| 381636 ||  || — || December 30, 2008 || Mount Lemmon || Mount Lemmon Survey || HYG || align=right | 2.7 km || 
|-id=637 bgcolor=#d6d6d6
| 381637 ||  || — || December 30, 2008 || Mount Lemmon || Mount Lemmon Survey || — || align=right | 3.4 km || 
|-id=638 bgcolor=#d6d6d6
| 381638 ||  || — || December 29, 2008 || Kitt Peak || Spacewatch || TRP || align=right | 3.3 km || 
|-id=639 bgcolor=#d6d6d6
| 381639 ||  || — || December 29, 2008 || Mount Lemmon || Mount Lemmon Survey || THM || align=right | 1.9 km || 
|-id=640 bgcolor=#d6d6d6
| 381640 ||  || — || December 29, 2008 || Kitt Peak || Spacewatch || — || align=right | 2.5 km || 
|-id=641 bgcolor=#d6d6d6
| 381641 ||  || — || December 29, 2008 || Kitt Peak || Spacewatch || — || align=right | 3.3 km || 
|-id=642 bgcolor=#d6d6d6
| 381642 ||  || — || December 30, 2008 || Kitt Peak || Spacewatch || — || align=right | 3.3 km || 
|-id=643 bgcolor=#d6d6d6
| 381643 ||  || — || December 30, 2008 || Kitt Peak || Spacewatch || — || align=right | 2.5 km || 
|-id=644 bgcolor=#d6d6d6
| 381644 ||  || — || December 30, 2008 || Kitt Peak || Spacewatch || THM || align=right | 2.4 km || 
|-id=645 bgcolor=#d6d6d6
| 381645 ||  || — || December 30, 2008 || Kitt Peak || Spacewatch || — || align=right | 3.6 km || 
|-id=646 bgcolor=#d6d6d6
| 381646 ||  || — || December 30, 2008 || Kitt Peak || Spacewatch || — || align=right | 3.7 km || 
|-id=647 bgcolor=#d6d6d6
| 381647 ||  || — || December 30, 2008 || Mount Lemmon || Mount Lemmon Survey || — || align=right | 3.1 km || 
|-id=648 bgcolor=#d6d6d6
| 381648 ||  || — || December 22, 2008 || Kitt Peak || Spacewatch || — || align=right | 3.6 km || 
|-id=649 bgcolor=#d6d6d6
| 381649 ||  || — || December 21, 2008 || Kitt Peak || Spacewatch || — || align=right | 3.7 km || 
|-id=650 bgcolor=#d6d6d6
| 381650 ||  || — || December 29, 2008 || Mount Lemmon || Mount Lemmon Survey || — || align=right | 3.8 km || 
|-id=651 bgcolor=#d6d6d6
| 381651 ||  || — || December 30, 2008 || Mount Lemmon || Mount Lemmon Survey || — || align=right | 4.1 km || 
|-id=652 bgcolor=#d6d6d6
| 381652 ||  || — || January 2, 2009 || Kitt Peak || Spacewatch || — || align=right | 4.0 km || 
|-id=653 bgcolor=#d6d6d6
| 381653 ||  || — || January 2, 2009 || Mount Lemmon || Mount Lemmon Survey || VER || align=right | 2.9 km || 
|-id=654 bgcolor=#d6d6d6
| 381654 ||  || — || January 15, 2009 || Kitt Peak || Spacewatch || — || align=right | 2.8 km || 
|-id=655 bgcolor=#d6d6d6
| 381655 ||  || — || January 15, 2009 || Kitt Peak || Spacewatch || — || align=right | 4.9 km || 
|-id=656 bgcolor=#d6d6d6
| 381656 ||  || — || January 1, 2009 || Kitt Peak || Spacewatch || — || align=right | 3.8 km || 
|-id=657 bgcolor=#d6d6d6
| 381657 ||  || — || January 3, 2009 || Mount Lemmon || Mount Lemmon Survey || — || align=right | 3.8 km || 
|-id=658 bgcolor=#d6d6d6
| 381658 ||  || — || January 1, 2009 || Kitt Peak || Spacewatch || — || align=right | 3.9 km || 
|-id=659 bgcolor=#d6d6d6
| 381659 ||  || — || January 19, 2009 || Mayhill || A. Lowe || — || align=right | 4.3 km || 
|-id=660 bgcolor=#d6d6d6
| 381660 ||  || — || January 16, 2009 || Lulin || LUSS || — || align=right | 4.6 km || 
|-id=661 bgcolor=#d6d6d6
| 381661 ||  || — || January 17, 2009 || Socorro || LINEAR || — || align=right | 3.8 km || 
|-id=662 bgcolor=#d6d6d6
| 381662 ||  || — || January 18, 2009 || Socorro || LINEAR || URS || align=right | 4.1 km || 
|-id=663 bgcolor=#d6d6d6
| 381663 ||  || — || January 21, 2009 || Socorro || LINEAR || — || align=right | 4.0 km || 
|-id=664 bgcolor=#E9E9E9
| 381664 ||  || — || January 16, 2009 || Mount Lemmon || Mount Lemmon Survey || — || align=right | 2.9 km || 
|-id=665 bgcolor=#d6d6d6
| 381665 ||  || — || September 19, 2007 || Kitt Peak || Spacewatch || THM || align=right | 1.9 km || 
|-id=666 bgcolor=#E9E9E9
| 381666 ||  || — || January 17, 2009 || Kitt Peak || Spacewatch || — || align=right | 3.9 km || 
|-id=667 bgcolor=#d6d6d6
| 381667 ||  || — || January 16, 2009 || Kitt Peak || Spacewatch || ALA || align=right | 5.3 km || 
|-id=668 bgcolor=#d6d6d6
| 381668 ||  || — || January 16, 2009 || Kitt Peak || Spacewatch || — || align=right | 4.9 km || 
|-id=669 bgcolor=#d6d6d6
| 381669 ||  || — || January 16, 2009 || Kitt Peak || Spacewatch || EOS || align=right | 2.1 km || 
|-id=670 bgcolor=#d6d6d6
| 381670 ||  || — || October 8, 2007 || Mount Lemmon || Mount Lemmon Survey || THM || align=right | 2.0 km || 
|-id=671 bgcolor=#d6d6d6
| 381671 ||  || — || January 16, 2009 || Mount Lemmon || Mount Lemmon Survey || ALA || align=right | 5.1 km || 
|-id=672 bgcolor=#d6d6d6
| 381672 ||  || — || January 16, 2009 || Mount Lemmon || Mount Lemmon Survey || — || align=right | 5.6 km || 
|-id=673 bgcolor=#d6d6d6
| 381673 ||  || — || January 25, 2009 || Catalina || CSS || HYG || align=right | 2.9 km || 
|-id=674 bgcolor=#d6d6d6
| 381674 ||  || — || November 24, 2008 || Mount Lemmon || Mount Lemmon Survey || — || align=right | 3.0 km || 
|-id=675 bgcolor=#d6d6d6
| 381675 ||  || — || January 30, 2009 || Siding Spring || SSS || — || align=right | 3.7 km || 
|-id=676 bgcolor=#fefefe
| 381676 ||  || — || January 16, 2009 || Kitt Peak || Spacewatch || H || align=right data-sort-value="0.87" | 870 m || 
|-id=677 bgcolor=#FFC2E0
| 381677 ||  || — || October 30, 2008 || Kitt Peak || Spacewatch || APOslow? || align=right data-sort-value="0.47" | 470 m || 
|-id=678 bgcolor=#d6d6d6
| 381678 ||  || — || January 25, 2009 || Kitt Peak || Spacewatch || MRC || align=right | 2.9 km || 
|-id=679 bgcolor=#d6d6d6
| 381679 ||  || — || January 25, 2009 || Kitt Peak || Spacewatch || — || align=right | 2.4 km || 
|-id=680 bgcolor=#d6d6d6
| 381680 ||  || — || January 26, 2009 || Mount Lemmon || Mount Lemmon Survey || — || align=right | 3.1 km || 
|-id=681 bgcolor=#d6d6d6
| 381681 ||  || — || January 30, 2009 || Mount Lemmon || Mount Lemmon Survey || — || align=right | 3.6 km || 
|-id=682 bgcolor=#d6d6d6
| 381682 ||  || — || January 30, 2009 || Kitt Peak || Spacewatch || — || align=right | 3.8 km || 
|-id=683 bgcolor=#d6d6d6
| 381683 ||  || — || January 29, 2009 || Mount Lemmon || Mount Lemmon Survey || — || align=right | 3.1 km || 
|-id=684 bgcolor=#d6d6d6
| 381684 ||  || — || January 29, 2009 || Catalina || CSS || TIR || align=right | 3.3 km || 
|-id=685 bgcolor=#d6d6d6
| 381685 ||  || — || October 9, 2007 || Catalina || CSS || URS || align=right | 4.0 km || 
|-id=686 bgcolor=#d6d6d6
| 381686 ||  || — || January 26, 2009 || Socorro || LINEAR || — || align=right | 2.9 km || 
|-id=687 bgcolor=#d6d6d6
| 381687 || 2009 CY || — || February 2, 2009 || Sierra Stars || F. Tozzi || — || align=right | 3.4 km || 
|-id=688 bgcolor=#d6d6d6
| 381688 ||  || — || February 2, 2009 || Bisei SG Center || BATTeRS || HYG || align=right | 2.6 km || 
|-id=689 bgcolor=#d6d6d6
| 381689 ||  || — || February 3, 2009 || Mount Lemmon || Mount Lemmon Survey || EUP || align=right | 5.3 km || 
|-id=690 bgcolor=#d6d6d6
| 381690 ||  || — || February 1, 2009 || Kitt Peak || Spacewatch || THM || align=right | 2.6 km || 
|-id=691 bgcolor=#d6d6d6
| 381691 ||  || — || February 2, 2009 || Mount Lemmon || Mount Lemmon Survey || TIR || align=right | 2.3 km || 
|-id=692 bgcolor=#d6d6d6
| 381692 ||  || — || January 18, 2009 || Kitt Peak || Spacewatch || — || align=right | 2.4 km || 
|-id=693 bgcolor=#d6d6d6
| 381693 ||  || — || February 14, 2009 || La Sagra || OAM Obs. || LIX || align=right | 5.2 km || 
|-id=694 bgcolor=#d6d6d6
| 381694 ||  || — || February 14, 2009 || La Sagra || OAM Obs. || — || align=right | 2.7 km || 
|-id=695 bgcolor=#d6d6d6
| 381695 ||  || — || February 14, 2009 || Catalina || CSS || — || align=right | 2.9 km || 
|-id=696 bgcolor=#d6d6d6
| 381696 ||  || — || October 2, 2008 || Mount Lemmon || Mount Lemmon Survey || — || align=right | 3.4 km || 
|-id=697 bgcolor=#d6d6d6
| 381697 ||  || — || February 17, 2009 || Kitt Peak || Spacewatch || — || align=right | 4.7 km || 
|-id=698 bgcolor=#d6d6d6
| 381698 ||  || — || February 26, 2009 || Catalina || CSS || THB || align=right | 2.8 km || 
|-id=699 bgcolor=#d6d6d6
| 381699 ||  || — || February 20, 2009 || Siding Spring || SSS || — || align=right | 5.6 km || 
|-id=700 bgcolor=#d6d6d6
| 381700 ||  || — || March 3, 2009 || Catalina || CSS || — || align=right | 3.1 km || 
|}

381701–381800 

|-bgcolor=#d6d6d6
| 381701 ||  || — || March 15, 2009 || Catalina || CSS || — || align=right | 2.9 km || 
|-id=702 bgcolor=#d6d6d6
| 381702 ||  || — || March 18, 2009 || Socorro || LINEAR || — || align=right | 3.4 km || 
|-id=703 bgcolor=#C2FFFF
| 381703 ||  || — || April 27, 2009 || Kitt Peak || Spacewatch || L5 || align=right | 8.4 km || 
|-id=704 bgcolor=#d6d6d6
| 381704 ||  || — || November 19, 2007 || Mount Lemmon || Mount Lemmon Survey || EOS || align=right | 2.2 km || 
|-id=705 bgcolor=#fefefe
| 381705 ||  || — || June 15, 2009 || Mount Lemmon || Mount Lemmon Survey || FLO || align=right data-sort-value="0.73" | 730 m || 
|-id=706 bgcolor=#fefefe
| 381706 ||  || — || July 13, 2009 || Kitt Peak || Spacewatch || — || align=right data-sort-value="0.67" | 670 m || 
|-id=707 bgcolor=#fefefe
| 381707 ||  || — || August 14, 2009 || La Sagra || OAM Obs. || — || align=right data-sort-value="0.82" | 820 m || 
|-id=708 bgcolor=#fefefe
| 381708 ||  || — || August 15, 2009 || Kitt Peak || Spacewatch || MAS || align=right data-sort-value="0.68" | 680 m || 
|-id=709 bgcolor=#fefefe
| 381709 ||  || — || August 15, 2009 || Catalina || CSS || ERI || align=right | 1.4 km || 
|-id=710 bgcolor=#fefefe
| 381710 ||  || — || August 15, 2009 || La Sagra || OAM Obs. || — || align=right data-sort-value="0.81" | 810 m || 
|-id=711 bgcolor=#fefefe
| 381711 ||  || — || August 15, 2009 || Kitt Peak || Spacewatch || V || align=right data-sort-value="0.55" | 550 m || 
|-id=712 bgcolor=#fefefe
| 381712 ||  || — || August 17, 2009 || Catalina || CSS || — || align=right data-sort-value="0.99" | 990 m || 
|-id=713 bgcolor=#fefefe
| 381713 ||  || — || August 18, 2009 || Wildberg || R. Apitzsch || NYS || align=right data-sort-value="0.60" | 600 m || 
|-id=714 bgcolor=#fefefe
| 381714 ||  || — || August 17, 2009 || La Sagra || OAM Obs. || — || align=right | 1.2 km || 
|-id=715 bgcolor=#fefefe
| 381715 ||  || — || August 17, 2009 || Kitt Peak || Spacewatch || NYS || align=right data-sort-value="0.65" | 650 m || 
|-id=716 bgcolor=#fefefe
| 381716 ||  || — || August 31, 2009 || Bergisch Gladbac || W. Bickel || — || align=right data-sort-value="0.95" | 950 m || 
|-id=717 bgcolor=#fefefe
| 381717 ||  || — || August 16, 2009 || Kitt Peak || Spacewatch || EUT || align=right data-sort-value="0.61" | 610 m || 
|-id=718 bgcolor=#fefefe
| 381718 ||  || — || August 15, 2009 || Kitt Peak || Spacewatch || MAS || align=right data-sort-value="0.77" | 770 m || 
|-id=719 bgcolor=#fefefe
| 381719 ||  || — || August 27, 2009 || Catalina || CSS || MAS || align=right data-sort-value="0.69" | 690 m || 
|-id=720 bgcolor=#fefefe
| 381720 ||  || — || August 27, 2009 || Kitt Peak || Spacewatch || — || align=right data-sort-value="0.82" | 820 m || 
|-id=721 bgcolor=#fefefe
| 381721 ||  || — || September 19, 2006 || Anderson Mesa || LONEOS || — || align=right data-sort-value="0.85" | 850 m || 
|-id=722 bgcolor=#fefefe
| 381722 ||  || — || September 9, 2009 || Bisei SG Center || BATTeRS || — || align=right data-sort-value="0.84" | 840 m || 
|-id=723 bgcolor=#fefefe
| 381723 ||  || — || September 11, 2009 || La Sagra || OAM Obs. || — || align=right | 1.2 km || 
|-id=724 bgcolor=#fefefe
| 381724 ||  || — || September 13, 2009 || Socorro || LINEAR || FLO || align=right data-sort-value="0.85" | 850 m || 
|-id=725 bgcolor=#fefefe
| 381725 ||  || — || September 13, 2009 || ESA OGS || ESA OGS || NYS || align=right data-sort-value="0.69" | 690 m || 
|-id=726 bgcolor=#fefefe
| 381726 ||  || — || September 12, 2009 || Kitt Peak || Spacewatch || MAS || align=right data-sort-value="0.71" | 710 m || 
|-id=727 bgcolor=#fefefe
| 381727 ||  || — || September 12, 2009 || Kitt Peak || Spacewatch || MAS || align=right data-sort-value="0.74" | 740 m || 
|-id=728 bgcolor=#fefefe
| 381728 ||  || — || September 12, 2009 || Kitt Peak || Spacewatch || — || align=right data-sort-value="0.93" | 930 m || 
|-id=729 bgcolor=#fefefe
| 381729 ||  || — || September 13, 2009 || Purple Mountain || PMO NEO || — || align=right data-sort-value="0.78" | 780 m || 
|-id=730 bgcolor=#fefefe
| 381730 ||  || — || September 13, 2009 || XuYi || PMO NEO || — || align=right | 1.7 km || 
|-id=731 bgcolor=#fefefe
| 381731 ||  || — || September 15, 2009 || Kitt Peak || Spacewatch || — || align=right data-sort-value="0.97" | 970 m || 
|-id=732 bgcolor=#fefefe
| 381732 ||  || — || September 13, 2009 || Socorro || LINEAR || — || align=right data-sort-value="0.87" | 870 m || 
|-id=733 bgcolor=#fefefe
| 381733 ||  || — || September 15, 2009 || Kitt Peak || Spacewatch || — || align=right data-sort-value="0.69" | 690 m || 
|-id=734 bgcolor=#fefefe
| 381734 ||  || — || September 15, 2009 || Kitt Peak || Spacewatch || NYS || align=right | 1.7 km || 
|-id=735 bgcolor=#fefefe
| 381735 ||  || — || September 15, 2009 || Kitt Peak || Spacewatch || — || align=right | 1.0 km || 
|-id=736 bgcolor=#fefefe
| 381736 ||  || — || September 15, 2009 || Kitt Peak || Spacewatch || — || align=right | 1.4 km || 
|-id=737 bgcolor=#fefefe
| 381737 ||  || — || September 14, 2009 || La Sagra || OAM Obs. || NYS || align=right data-sort-value="0.71" | 710 m || 
|-id=738 bgcolor=#fefefe
| 381738 ||  || — || September 12, 2009 || Kitt Peak || Spacewatch || — || align=right data-sort-value="0.79" | 790 m || 
|-id=739 bgcolor=#C2FFFF
| 381739 ||  || — || September 17, 2009 || Mount Lemmon || Mount Lemmon Survey || L5 || align=right | 11 km || 
|-id=740 bgcolor=#fefefe
| 381740 ||  || — || September 16, 2009 || Kitt Peak || Spacewatch || — || align=right | 1.1 km || 
|-id=741 bgcolor=#fefefe
| 381741 ||  || — || September 16, 2009 || Kitt Peak || Spacewatch || — || align=right data-sort-value="0.78" | 780 m || 
|-id=742 bgcolor=#fefefe
| 381742 ||  || — || September 17, 2009 || Kitt Peak || Spacewatch || MAS || align=right data-sort-value="0.68" | 680 m || 
|-id=743 bgcolor=#fefefe
| 381743 ||  || — || September 17, 2009 || Kitt Peak || Spacewatch || — || align=right data-sort-value="0.89" | 890 m || 
|-id=744 bgcolor=#E9E9E9
| 381744 ||  || — || September 17, 2009 || Kitt Peak || Spacewatch || HEN || align=right data-sort-value="0.96" | 960 m || 
|-id=745 bgcolor=#fefefe
| 381745 ||  || — || September 17, 2009 || Kitt Peak || Spacewatch || — || align=right data-sort-value="0.89" | 890 m || 
|-id=746 bgcolor=#fefefe
| 381746 ||  || — || November 17, 2006 || Kitt Peak || Spacewatch || — || align=right data-sort-value="0.92" | 920 m || 
|-id=747 bgcolor=#fefefe
| 381747 ||  || — || September 21, 2009 || La Sagra || OAM Obs. || — || align=right | 1.4 km || 
|-id=748 bgcolor=#fefefe
| 381748 ||  || — || September 24, 2009 || La Sagra || OAM Obs. || PHO || align=right | 1.2 km || 
|-id=749 bgcolor=#fefefe
| 381749 ||  || — || September 18, 2009 || Kitt Peak || Spacewatch || LCI || align=right | 1.0 km || 
|-id=750 bgcolor=#fefefe
| 381750 ||  || — || September 18, 2009 || Kitt Peak || Spacewatch || — || align=right data-sort-value="0.82" | 820 m || 
|-id=751 bgcolor=#fefefe
| 381751 ||  || — || September 18, 2009 || Kitt Peak || Spacewatch || — || align=right | 1.0 km || 
|-id=752 bgcolor=#fefefe
| 381752 ||  || — || September 18, 2009 || Kitt Peak || Spacewatch || — || align=right data-sort-value="0.83" | 830 m || 
|-id=753 bgcolor=#fefefe
| 381753 ||  || — || September 19, 2009 || Kitt Peak || Spacewatch || — || align=right data-sort-value="0.85" | 850 m || 
|-id=754 bgcolor=#fefefe
| 381754 ||  || — || September 19, 2009 || Kitt Peak || Spacewatch || — || align=right data-sort-value="0.91" | 910 m || 
|-id=755 bgcolor=#fefefe
| 381755 ||  || — || September 19, 2009 || Kitt Peak || Spacewatch || NYS || align=right data-sort-value="0.61" | 610 m || 
|-id=756 bgcolor=#fefefe
| 381756 ||  || — || September 20, 2009 || Kitt Peak || Spacewatch || FLO || align=right data-sort-value="0.83" | 830 m || 
|-id=757 bgcolor=#fefefe
| 381757 ||  || — || November 12, 2005 || Kitt Peak || Spacewatch || NYS || align=right data-sort-value="0.77" | 770 m || 
|-id=758 bgcolor=#fefefe
| 381758 ||  || — || September 21, 2009 || Kitt Peak || Spacewatch || — || align=right | 1.1 km || 
|-id=759 bgcolor=#fefefe
| 381759 ||  || — || September 22, 2009 || Kitt Peak || Spacewatch || — || align=right | 2.2 km || 
|-id=760 bgcolor=#fefefe
| 381760 ||  || — || September 23, 2009 || Kitt Peak || Spacewatch || NYS || align=right data-sort-value="0.85" | 850 m || 
|-id=761 bgcolor=#fefefe
| 381761 ||  || — || August 15, 2009 || Kitt Peak || Spacewatch || V || align=right data-sort-value="0.76" | 760 m || 
|-id=762 bgcolor=#fefefe
| 381762 ||  || — || September 16, 2009 || Catalina || CSS || — || align=right | 1.9 km || 
|-id=763 bgcolor=#fefefe
| 381763 ||  || — || September 23, 2009 || Mount Lemmon || Mount Lemmon Survey || — || align=right | 1.1 km || 
|-id=764 bgcolor=#fefefe
| 381764 ||  || — || September 23, 2009 || Mount Lemmon || Mount Lemmon Survey || — || align=right data-sort-value="0.83" | 830 m || 
|-id=765 bgcolor=#fefefe
| 381765 ||  || — || September 25, 2009 || Kitt Peak || Spacewatch || NYS || align=right data-sort-value="0.65" | 650 m || 
|-id=766 bgcolor=#fefefe
| 381766 ||  || — || September 25, 2009 || Kitt Peak || Spacewatch || MAS || align=right data-sort-value="0.60" | 600 m || 
|-id=767 bgcolor=#fefefe
| 381767 ||  || — || September 25, 2009 || Catalina || CSS || NYS || align=right data-sort-value="0.86" | 860 m || 
|-id=768 bgcolor=#fefefe
| 381768 ||  || — || September 25, 2009 || Kitt Peak || Spacewatch || — || align=right data-sort-value="0.87" | 870 m || 
|-id=769 bgcolor=#fefefe
| 381769 ||  || — || September 19, 2009 || Mount Lemmon || Mount Lemmon Survey || V || align=right data-sort-value="0.63" | 630 m || 
|-id=770 bgcolor=#fefefe
| 381770 ||  || — || September 25, 2009 || Kitt Peak || Spacewatch || MAS || align=right data-sort-value="0.74" | 740 m || 
|-id=771 bgcolor=#fefefe
| 381771 ||  || — || September 27, 2009 || Kitt Peak || Spacewatch || — || align=right | 2.0 km || 
|-id=772 bgcolor=#fefefe
| 381772 ||  || — || September 29, 2009 || Črni Vrh || Črni Vrh || — || align=right | 1.4 km || 
|-id=773 bgcolor=#fefefe
| 381773 ||  || — || September 19, 2009 || Catalina || CSS || NYS || align=right data-sort-value="0.72" | 720 m || 
|-id=774 bgcolor=#fefefe
| 381774 ||  || — || October 19, 1995 || Kitt Peak || Spacewatch || V || align=right data-sort-value="0.75" | 750 m || 
|-id=775 bgcolor=#fefefe
| 381775 ||  || — || September 24, 2009 || Catalina || CSS || — || align=right | 1.0 km || 
|-id=776 bgcolor=#fefefe
| 381776 ||  || — || September 28, 2009 || Kitt Peak || Spacewatch || NYS || align=right data-sort-value="0.61" | 610 m || 
|-id=777 bgcolor=#fefefe
| 381777 ||  || — || September 18, 2009 || Kitt Peak || Spacewatch || — || align=right | 1.1 km || 
|-id=778 bgcolor=#fefefe
| 381778 ||  || — || September 22, 2009 || Kitt Peak || Spacewatch || NYS || align=right data-sort-value="0.71" | 710 m || 
|-id=779 bgcolor=#fefefe
| 381779 ||  || — || September 28, 2009 || Mount Lemmon || Mount Lemmon Survey || — || align=right data-sort-value="0.86" | 860 m || 
|-id=780 bgcolor=#fefefe
| 381780 ||  || — || October 10, 2009 || Bisei SG Center || BATTeRS || NYS || align=right data-sort-value="0.50" | 500 m || 
|-id=781 bgcolor=#fefefe
| 381781 ||  || — || June 4, 2005 || Kitt Peak || Spacewatch || — || align=right data-sort-value="0.78" | 780 m || 
|-id=782 bgcolor=#fefefe
| 381782 ||  || — || October 9, 2009 || Catalina || CSS || — || align=right data-sort-value="0.95" | 950 m || 
|-id=783 bgcolor=#FA8072
| 381783 ||  || — || August 18, 2009 || Catalina || CSS || — || align=right | 1.0 km || 
|-id=784 bgcolor=#fefefe
| 381784 ||  || — || October 10, 2009 || La Sagra || OAM Obs. || — || align=right data-sort-value="0.98" | 980 m || 
|-id=785 bgcolor=#fefefe
| 381785 ||  || — || September 15, 2009 || Kitt Peak || Spacewatch || — || align=right data-sort-value="0.72" | 720 m || 
|-id=786 bgcolor=#fefefe
| 381786 ||  || — || November 14, 1998 || Kitt Peak || Spacewatch || NYS || align=right data-sort-value="0.68" | 680 m || 
|-id=787 bgcolor=#fefefe
| 381787 ||  || — || October 14, 2009 || Mount Lemmon || Mount Lemmon Survey || CIM || align=right | 2.2 km || 
|-id=788 bgcolor=#fefefe
| 381788 ||  || — || October 11, 2009 || La Sagra || OAM Obs. || — || align=right | 1.1 km || 
|-id=789 bgcolor=#fefefe
| 381789 ||  || — || October 15, 2009 || La Sagra || OAM Obs. || — || align=right | 1.2 km || 
|-id=790 bgcolor=#fefefe
| 381790 ||  || — || October 10, 2009 || Sierra Stars || W. G. Dillon, D. Wells || — || align=right data-sort-value="0.68" | 680 m || 
|-id=791 bgcolor=#fefefe
| 381791 ||  || — || October 15, 2009 || Catalina || CSS || — || align=right | 2.4 km || 
|-id=792 bgcolor=#fefefe
| 381792 ||  || — || June 17, 2009 || Kitt Peak || Spacewatch || — || align=right data-sort-value="0.80" | 800 m || 
|-id=793 bgcolor=#fefefe
| 381793 ||  || — || October 20, 2009 || Socorro || LINEAR || — || align=right data-sort-value="0.93" | 930 m || 
|-id=794 bgcolor=#fefefe
| 381794 ||  || — || October 22, 2009 || Catalina || CSS || V || align=right | 1.0 km || 
|-id=795 bgcolor=#fefefe
| 381795 ||  || — || October 23, 2009 || Marly || P. Kocher || — || align=right | 2.4 km || 
|-id=796 bgcolor=#E9E9E9
| 381796 ||  || — || October 18, 2009 || Mount Lemmon || Mount Lemmon Survey || JUN || align=right | 1.1 km || 
|-id=797 bgcolor=#E9E9E9
| 381797 ||  || — || October 22, 2009 || Mount Lemmon || Mount Lemmon Survey || — || align=right data-sort-value="0.88" | 880 m || 
|-id=798 bgcolor=#fefefe
| 381798 ||  || — || October 18, 2009 || Mount Lemmon || Mount Lemmon Survey || — || align=right | 2.0 km || 
|-id=799 bgcolor=#fefefe
| 381799 ||  || — || October 18, 2009 || Mount Lemmon || Mount Lemmon Survey || — || align=right | 1.0 km || 
|-id=800 bgcolor=#fefefe
| 381800 ||  || — || September 17, 2009 || Kitt Peak || Spacewatch || NYS || align=right data-sort-value="0.70" | 700 m || 
|}

381801–381900 

|-bgcolor=#fefefe
| 381801 ||  || — || February 19, 2001 || Socorro || LINEAR || — || align=right data-sort-value="0.90" | 900 m || 
|-id=802 bgcolor=#fefefe
| 381802 ||  || — || October 23, 2009 || Mount Lemmon || Mount Lemmon Survey || V || align=right data-sort-value="0.83" | 830 m || 
|-id=803 bgcolor=#E9E9E9
| 381803 ||  || — || October 23, 2009 || Kitt Peak || Spacewatch || — || align=right data-sort-value="0.72" | 720 m || 
|-id=804 bgcolor=#fefefe
| 381804 ||  || — || October 21, 2009 || Mount Lemmon || Mount Lemmon Survey || — || align=right data-sort-value="0.98" | 980 m || 
|-id=805 bgcolor=#fefefe
| 381805 ||  || — || April 14, 2008 || Kitt Peak || Spacewatch || NYS || align=right data-sort-value="0.62" | 620 m || 
|-id=806 bgcolor=#fefefe
| 381806 ||  || — || September 16, 2009 || Kitt Peak || Spacewatch || FLO || align=right data-sort-value="0.68" | 680 m || 
|-id=807 bgcolor=#fefefe
| 381807 ||  || — || February 21, 2007 || Kitt Peak || Spacewatch || MAS || align=right data-sort-value="0.65" | 650 m || 
|-id=808 bgcolor=#fefefe
| 381808 ||  || — || October 23, 2009 || Mount Lemmon || Mount Lemmon Survey || NYS || align=right data-sort-value="0.63" | 630 m || 
|-id=809 bgcolor=#fefefe
| 381809 ||  || — || October 24, 2009 || Mount Lemmon || Mount Lemmon Survey || — || align=right | 1.5 km || 
|-id=810 bgcolor=#E9E9E9
| 381810 ||  || — || October 24, 2009 || Kitt Peak || Spacewatch || — || align=right | 1.7 km || 
|-id=811 bgcolor=#fefefe
| 381811 ||  || — || April 13, 2004 || Kitt Peak || Spacewatch || — || align=right | 1.0 km || 
|-id=812 bgcolor=#E9E9E9
| 381812 ||  || — || March 31, 2008 || Catalina || CSS || — || align=right | 2.2 km || 
|-id=813 bgcolor=#E9E9E9
| 381813 ||  || — || November 9, 2009 || Mount Lemmon || Mount Lemmon Survey || — || align=right | 1.0 km || 
|-id=814 bgcolor=#E9E9E9
| 381814 ||  || — || November 10, 2009 || Dauban || F. Kugel || MAR || align=right data-sort-value="0.78" | 780 m || 
|-id=815 bgcolor=#E9E9E9
| 381815 ||  || — || October 23, 2009 || Kitt Peak || Spacewatch || JUL || align=right | 1.3 km || 
|-id=816 bgcolor=#fefefe
| 381816 ||  || — || November 9, 2009 || Kitt Peak || Spacewatch || — || align=right | 2.3 km || 
|-id=817 bgcolor=#fefefe
| 381817 ||  || — || November 11, 2009 || Kitt Peak || Spacewatch || MAS || align=right data-sort-value="0.65" | 650 m || 
|-id=818 bgcolor=#fefefe
| 381818 ||  || — || October 22, 2009 || Mount Lemmon || Mount Lemmon Survey || MAS || align=right data-sort-value="0.65" | 650 m || 
|-id=819 bgcolor=#E9E9E9
| 381819 ||  || — || November 11, 2009 || Catalina || CSS || GER || align=right | 2.0 km || 
|-id=820 bgcolor=#E9E9E9
| 381820 ||  || — || November 9, 2009 || Kitt Peak || Spacewatch || — || align=right data-sort-value="0.81" | 810 m || 
|-id=821 bgcolor=#fefefe
| 381821 ||  || — || November 9, 2009 || Mount Lemmon || Mount Lemmon Survey || NYS || align=right data-sort-value="0.77" | 770 m || 
|-id=822 bgcolor=#fefefe
| 381822 ||  || — || November 13, 2009 || La Sagra || OAM Obs. || FLO || align=right data-sort-value="0.85" | 850 m || 
|-id=823 bgcolor=#FA8072
| 381823 ||  || — || July 23, 2009 || Siding Spring || SSS || PHO || align=right | 1.1 km || 
|-id=824 bgcolor=#E9E9E9
| 381824 ||  || — || November 9, 2009 || Kitt Peak || Spacewatch || — || align=right data-sort-value="0.81" | 810 m || 
|-id=825 bgcolor=#fefefe
| 381825 ||  || — || November 10, 2009 || Kitt Peak || Spacewatch || NYS || align=right data-sort-value="0.68" | 680 m || 
|-id=826 bgcolor=#fefefe
| 381826 ||  || — || November 10, 2009 || Kitt Peak || Spacewatch || — || align=right data-sort-value="0.89" | 890 m || 
|-id=827 bgcolor=#E9E9E9
| 381827 ||  || — || November 11, 2009 || Mount Lemmon || Mount Lemmon Survey || RAF || align=right | 1.0 km || 
|-id=828 bgcolor=#E9E9E9
| 381828 ||  || — || November 11, 2009 || Mount Lemmon || Mount Lemmon Survey || — || align=right | 2.4 km || 
|-id=829 bgcolor=#E9E9E9
| 381829 ||  || — || November 11, 2009 || Mount Lemmon || Mount Lemmon Survey || — || align=right | 1.3 km || 
|-id=830 bgcolor=#E9E9E9
| 381830 ||  || — || November 11, 2009 || Mount Lemmon || Mount Lemmon Survey || INO || align=right | 1.2 km || 
|-id=831 bgcolor=#E9E9E9
| 381831 ||  || — || November 9, 2009 || Mount Lemmon || Mount Lemmon Survey || — || align=right | 1.5 km || 
|-id=832 bgcolor=#E9E9E9
| 381832 ||  || — || November 17, 2009 || Kitt Peak || Spacewatch || — || align=right | 1.3 km || 
|-id=833 bgcolor=#fefefe
| 381833 ||  || — || November 16, 2009 || Kitt Peak || Spacewatch || — || align=right data-sort-value="0.80" | 800 m || 
|-id=834 bgcolor=#fefefe
| 381834 ||  || — || November 16, 2009 || Kitt Peak || Spacewatch || MAS || align=right data-sort-value="0.76" | 760 m || 
|-id=835 bgcolor=#E9E9E9
| 381835 ||  || — || November 10, 2009 || Kitt Peak || Spacewatch || HNS || align=right | 1.5 km || 
|-id=836 bgcolor=#E9E9E9
| 381836 ||  || — || November 17, 2009 || Mount Lemmon || Mount Lemmon Survey || — || align=right | 1.2 km || 
|-id=837 bgcolor=#E9E9E9
| 381837 ||  || — || November 18, 2009 || Kitt Peak || Spacewatch || — || align=right | 1.0 km || 
|-id=838 bgcolor=#fefefe
| 381838 ||  || — || November 18, 2009 || Mount Lemmon || Mount Lemmon Survey || NYS || align=right data-sort-value="0.86" | 860 m || 
|-id=839 bgcolor=#fefefe
| 381839 ||  || — || November 18, 2009 || Kitt Peak || Spacewatch || V || align=right | 1.1 km || 
|-id=840 bgcolor=#E9E9E9
| 381840 ||  || — || May 7, 2007 || Catalina || CSS || ADE || align=right | 3.1 km || 
|-id=841 bgcolor=#fefefe
| 381841 ||  || — || November 20, 2009 || Mount Lemmon || Mount Lemmon Survey || — || align=right data-sort-value="0.88" | 880 m || 
|-id=842 bgcolor=#E9E9E9
| 381842 ||  || — || January 6, 2006 || Mount Lemmon || Mount Lemmon Survey || — || align=right data-sort-value="0.88" | 880 m || 
|-id=843 bgcolor=#E9E9E9
| 381843 ||  || — || November 20, 2009 || Kitt Peak || Spacewatch || — || align=right | 1.4 km || 
|-id=844 bgcolor=#FA8072
| 381844 ||  || — || December 2, 2005 || Kitt Peak || Spacewatch || — || align=right data-sort-value="0.85" | 850 m || 
|-id=845 bgcolor=#E9E9E9
| 381845 ||  || — || November 22, 2009 || Catalina || CSS || — || align=right | 1.2 km || 
|-id=846 bgcolor=#E9E9E9
| 381846 ||  || — || November 25, 2005 || Kitt Peak || Spacewatch || — || align=right data-sort-value="0.95" | 950 m || 
|-id=847 bgcolor=#E9E9E9
| 381847 ||  || — || November 17, 2009 || Mount Lemmon || Mount Lemmon Survey || JUL || align=right | 1.1 km || 
|-id=848 bgcolor=#E9E9E9
| 381848 ||  || — || November 16, 2009 || Kitt Peak || Spacewatch || — || align=right | 1.3 km || 
|-id=849 bgcolor=#E9E9E9
| 381849 ||  || — || November 16, 2009 || Mount Lemmon || Mount Lemmon Survey || — || align=right | 2.9 km || 
|-id=850 bgcolor=#E9E9E9
| 381850 ||  || — || November 17, 2009 || Mount Lemmon || Mount Lemmon Survey || — || align=right | 2.9 km || 
|-id=851 bgcolor=#E9E9E9
| 381851 ||  || — || October 27, 2009 || Catalina || CSS || — || align=right | 1.7 km || 
|-id=852 bgcolor=#E9E9E9
| 381852 ||  || — || November 20, 2009 || Mount Lemmon || Mount Lemmon Survey || EUN || align=right | 1.1 km || 
|-id=853 bgcolor=#E9E9E9
| 381853 ||  || — || November 19, 2009 || Mount Lemmon || Mount Lemmon Survey || — || align=right data-sort-value="0.82" | 820 m || 
|-id=854 bgcolor=#fefefe
| 381854 ||  || — || November 16, 2009 || Socorro || LINEAR || — || align=right | 1.0 km || 
|-id=855 bgcolor=#E9E9E9
| 381855 ||  || — || November 16, 2009 || Mount Lemmon || Mount Lemmon Survey || — || align=right | 2.5 km || 
|-id=856 bgcolor=#E9E9E9
| 381856 ||  || — || December 15, 2009 || Mount Lemmon || Mount Lemmon Survey || — || align=right | 3.1 km || 
|-id=857 bgcolor=#E9E9E9
| 381857 ||  || — || December 15, 2009 || Mount Lemmon || Mount Lemmon Survey || — || align=right | 2.7 km || 
|-id=858 bgcolor=#fefefe
| 381858 ||  || — || December 15, 2009 || Mount Lemmon || Mount Lemmon Survey || MAS || align=right data-sort-value="0.86" | 860 m || 
|-id=859 bgcolor=#E9E9E9
| 381859 ||  || — || December 15, 2009 || Mount Lemmon || Mount Lemmon Survey || — || align=right | 1.1 km || 
|-id=860 bgcolor=#E9E9E9
| 381860 ||  || — || December 15, 2009 || Catalina || CSS || — || align=right | 1.5 km || 
|-id=861 bgcolor=#d6d6d6
| 381861 ||  || — || December 15, 2009 || Mount Lemmon || Mount Lemmon Survey || — || align=right | 2.9 km || 
|-id=862 bgcolor=#fefefe
| 381862 ||  || — || December 16, 2009 || Kitt Peak || Spacewatch || MAS || align=right data-sort-value="0.94" | 940 m || 
|-id=863 bgcolor=#E9E9E9
| 381863 ||  || — || December 27, 2009 || Kitt Peak || Spacewatch || — || align=right | 2.3 km || 
|-id=864 bgcolor=#E9E9E9
| 381864 ||  || — || December 18, 2009 || Kitt Peak || Spacewatch || EUN || align=right | 1.4 km || 
|-id=865 bgcolor=#E9E9E9
| 381865 ||  || — || December 19, 2009 || Mount Lemmon || Mount Lemmon Survey || — || align=right | 4.1 km || 
|-id=866 bgcolor=#fefefe
| 381866 ||  || — || January 6, 2010 || Kitt Peak || Spacewatch || — || align=right | 1.3 km || 
|-id=867 bgcolor=#E9E9E9
| 381867 ||  || — || September 10, 2004 || Socorro || LINEAR || — || align=right | 2.2 km || 
|-id=868 bgcolor=#E9E9E9
| 381868 ||  || — || January 6, 2010 || Kitt Peak || Spacewatch || HOF || align=right | 3.1 km || 
|-id=869 bgcolor=#E9E9E9
| 381869 ||  || — || September 23, 2008 || Kitt Peak || Spacewatch || — || align=right | 2.2 km || 
|-id=870 bgcolor=#fefefe
| 381870 ||  || — || January 6, 2010 || Catalina || CSS || — || align=right | 1.3 km || 
|-id=871 bgcolor=#E9E9E9
| 381871 ||  || — || January 25, 2006 || Kitt Peak || Spacewatch || — || align=right | 1.4 km || 
|-id=872 bgcolor=#E9E9E9
| 381872 ||  || — || January 6, 2010 || Kitt Peak || Spacewatch || MAR || align=right | 1.3 km || 
|-id=873 bgcolor=#E9E9E9
| 381873 ||  || — || January 7, 2010 || Kitt Peak || Spacewatch || EUN || align=right | 1.7 km || 
|-id=874 bgcolor=#E9E9E9
| 381874 ||  || — || January 8, 2010 || Kitt Peak || Spacewatch || — || align=right | 2.0 km || 
|-id=875 bgcolor=#E9E9E9
| 381875 ||  || — || January 12, 2010 || Mayhill || A. Lowe || — || align=right | 2.5 km || 
|-id=876 bgcolor=#E9E9E9
| 381876 ||  || — || January 8, 2010 || Kitt Peak || Spacewatch || HEN || align=right | 1.5 km || 
|-id=877 bgcolor=#E9E9E9
| 381877 ||  || — || January 8, 2010 || Kitt Peak || Spacewatch || — || align=right | 3.0 km || 
|-id=878 bgcolor=#E9E9E9
| 381878 ||  || — || January 8, 2010 || Kitt Peak || Spacewatch || — || align=right | 1.8 km || 
|-id=879 bgcolor=#d6d6d6
| 381879 ||  || — || January 6, 2010 || Catalina || CSS || — || align=right | 3.1 km || 
|-id=880 bgcolor=#E9E9E9
| 381880 ||  || — || January 11, 2010 || Kitt Peak || Spacewatch || — || align=right | 2.6 km || 
|-id=881 bgcolor=#E9E9E9
| 381881 ||  || — || April 24, 2007 || Kitt Peak || Spacewatch || — || align=right | 1.2 km || 
|-id=882 bgcolor=#E9E9E9
| 381882 ||  || — || January 12, 2010 || Catalina || CSS || BRG || align=right | 1.7 km || 
|-id=883 bgcolor=#E9E9E9
| 381883 ||  || — || January 13, 2010 || Mount Lemmon || Mount Lemmon Survey || — || align=right | 1.9 km || 
|-id=884 bgcolor=#E9E9E9
| 381884 ||  || — || January 8, 2010 || Catalina || CSS || — || align=right | 3.6 km || 
|-id=885 bgcolor=#E9E9E9
| 381885 ||  || — || January 10, 2010 || Socorro || LINEAR || — || align=right | 1.8 km || 
|-id=886 bgcolor=#E9E9E9
| 381886 ||  || — || January 9, 2006 || Kitt Peak || Spacewatch || — || align=right | 1.0 km || 
|-id=887 bgcolor=#E9E9E9
| 381887 ||  || — || January 7, 2010 || Kitt Peak || Spacewatch || — || align=right | 1.4 km || 
|-id=888 bgcolor=#d6d6d6
| 381888 ||  || — || January 12, 2010 || WISE || WISE || — || align=right | 3.5 km || 
|-id=889 bgcolor=#d6d6d6
| 381889 ||  || — || January 12, 2010 || WISE || WISE || — || align=right | 3.7 km || 
|-id=890 bgcolor=#d6d6d6
| 381890 ||  || — || January 12, 2010 || WISE || WISE || URS || align=right | 5.5 km || 
|-id=891 bgcolor=#d6d6d6
| 381891 ||  || — || January 30, 2004 || Kitt Peak || Spacewatch || — || align=right | 4.7 km || 
|-id=892 bgcolor=#E9E9E9
| 381892 ||  || — || January 16, 2010 || Socorro || LINEAR || — || align=right | 1.7 km || 
|-id=893 bgcolor=#E9E9E9
| 381893 ||  || — || February 4, 2006 || Catalina || CSS || EUN || align=right | 1.5 km || 
|-id=894 bgcolor=#d6d6d6
| 381894 ||  || — || January 6, 2010 || Kitt Peak || Spacewatch || EOS || align=right | 2.4 km || 
|-id=895 bgcolor=#E9E9E9
| 381895 ||  || — || January 23, 2010 || Bisei SG Center || BATTeRS || — || align=right | 3.5 km || 
|-id=896 bgcolor=#d6d6d6
| 381896 ||  || — || January 16, 2010 || WISE || WISE || — || align=right | 4.2 km || 
|-id=897 bgcolor=#d6d6d6
| 381897 ||  || — || January 19, 2010 || WISE || WISE || — || align=right | 4.3 km || 
|-id=898 bgcolor=#d6d6d6
| 381898 ||  || — || January 19, 2010 || WISE || WISE || URS || align=right | 5.3 km || 
|-id=899 bgcolor=#d6d6d6
| 381899 ||  || — || November 7, 2007 || Kitt Peak || Spacewatch || — || align=right | 5.8 km || 
|-id=900 bgcolor=#d6d6d6
| 381900 ||  || — || January 24, 2010 || WISE || WISE || 7:4 || align=right | 5.1 km || 
|}

381901–382000 

|-bgcolor=#E9E9E9
| 381901 ||  || — || July 30, 2008 || Mount Lemmon || Mount Lemmon Survey || — || align=right | 2.4 km || 
|-id=902 bgcolor=#E9E9E9
| 381902 ||  || — || February 7, 2010 || La Sagra || OAM Obs. || JUN || align=right | 1.5 km || 
|-id=903 bgcolor=#E9E9E9
| 381903 ||  || — || February 6, 2010 || Mayhill || iTelescope Obs. || — || align=right | 2.2 km || 
|-id=904 bgcolor=#E9E9E9
| 381904 Beatita ||  ||  || February 12, 2010 || Mayhill || S. Kürti || — || align=right | 1.2 km || 
|-id=905 bgcolor=#d6d6d6
| 381905 ||  || — || February 11, 2010 || WISE || WISE || — || align=right | 4.3 km || 
|-id=906 bgcolor=#FFC2E0
| 381906 ||  || — || February 13, 2010 || Mount Lemmon || Mount Lemmon Survey || APO +1kmPHA || align=right data-sort-value="0.52" | 520 m || 
|-id=907 bgcolor=#E9E9E9
| 381907 ||  || — || February 8, 2010 || Kitt Peak || Spacewatch || — || align=right | 1.8 km || 
|-id=908 bgcolor=#d6d6d6
| 381908 ||  || — || February 9, 2010 || Mount Lemmon || Mount Lemmon Survey || — || align=right | 2.4 km || 
|-id=909 bgcolor=#d6d6d6
| 381909 ||  || — || February 9, 2010 || Kitt Peak || Spacewatch || — || align=right | 2.9 km || 
|-id=910 bgcolor=#d6d6d6
| 381910 ||  || — || February 9, 2010 || Kitt Peak || Spacewatch || — || align=right | 4.2 km || 
|-id=911 bgcolor=#E9E9E9
| 381911 ||  || — || February 9, 2010 || Kitt Peak || Spacewatch || — || align=right | 2.3 km || 
|-id=912 bgcolor=#d6d6d6
| 381912 ||  || — || February 13, 2010 || Kitt Peak || Spacewatch || — || align=right | 2.7 km || 
|-id=913 bgcolor=#d6d6d6
| 381913 ||  || — || February 13, 2010 || Kitt Peak || Spacewatch || — || align=right | 4.0 km || 
|-id=914 bgcolor=#E9E9E9
| 381914 ||  || — || February 5, 2010 || Catalina || CSS || — || align=right | 2.0 km || 
|-id=915 bgcolor=#d6d6d6
| 381915 ||  || — || February 5, 2010 || Catalina || CSS || — || align=right | 3.4 km || 
|-id=916 bgcolor=#E9E9E9
| 381916 ||  || — || February 13, 2010 || Calvin-Rehoboth || Calvin–Rehoboth Obs. || — || align=right | 1.3 km || 
|-id=917 bgcolor=#E9E9E9
| 381917 ||  || — || October 26, 2009 || Kitt Peak || Spacewatch || — || align=right | 1.4 km || 
|-id=918 bgcolor=#d6d6d6
| 381918 ||  || — || February 9, 2010 || Kitt Peak || Spacewatch || EOS || align=right | 2.4 km || 
|-id=919 bgcolor=#E9E9E9
| 381919 ||  || — || February 13, 2010 || Mount Lemmon || Mount Lemmon Survey || — || align=right | 2.0 km || 
|-id=920 bgcolor=#E9E9E9
| 381920 ||  || — || February 13, 2010 || Mount Lemmon || Mount Lemmon Survey || — || align=right | 1.9 km || 
|-id=921 bgcolor=#d6d6d6
| 381921 ||  || — || February 13, 2010 || Mount Lemmon || Mount Lemmon Survey || — || align=right | 3.1 km || 
|-id=922 bgcolor=#E9E9E9
| 381922 ||  || — || February 14, 2010 || Kitt Peak || Spacewatch || GEF || align=right | 1.3 km || 
|-id=923 bgcolor=#E9E9E9
| 381923 ||  || — || January 5, 2010 || Kitt Peak || Spacewatch || — || align=right | 3.0 km || 
|-id=924 bgcolor=#d6d6d6
| 381924 ||  || — || February 14, 2010 || Mount Lemmon || Mount Lemmon Survey || THM || align=right | 3.9 km || 
|-id=925 bgcolor=#E9E9E9
| 381925 ||  || — || December 9, 2004 || Socorro || LINEAR || — || align=right | 3.0 km || 
|-id=926 bgcolor=#d6d6d6
| 381926 ||  || — || February 10, 2010 || WISE || WISE || — || align=right | 4.8 km || 
|-id=927 bgcolor=#E9E9E9
| 381927 ||  || — || February 9, 2010 || Mount Lemmon || Mount Lemmon Survey || PAD || align=right | 3.7 km || 
|-id=928 bgcolor=#d6d6d6
| 381928 ||  || — || February 9, 2010 || Kitt Peak || Spacewatch || — || align=right | 2.1 km || 
|-id=929 bgcolor=#E9E9E9
| 381929 ||  || — || November 22, 2009 || Mount Lemmon || Mount Lemmon Survey || — || align=right | 1.5 km || 
|-id=930 bgcolor=#E9E9E9
| 381930 ||  || — || February 13, 2010 || Catalina || CSS || — || align=right | 1.9 km || 
|-id=931 bgcolor=#d6d6d6
| 381931 ||  || — || February 13, 2010 || Mount Lemmon || Mount Lemmon Survey || — || align=right | 3.5 km || 
|-id=932 bgcolor=#E9E9E9
| 381932 ||  || — || August 24, 2008 || Kitt Peak || Spacewatch || — || align=right | 2.4 km || 
|-id=933 bgcolor=#d6d6d6
| 381933 ||  || — || February 14, 2010 || Kitt Peak || Spacewatch || EOS || align=right | 3.4 km || 
|-id=934 bgcolor=#d6d6d6
| 381934 ||  || — || May 21, 2006 || Mount Lemmon || Mount Lemmon Survey || KAR || align=right | 1.2 km || 
|-id=935 bgcolor=#d6d6d6
| 381935 ||  || — || April 11, 2005 || Mount Lemmon || Mount Lemmon Survey || THM || align=right | 2.2 km || 
|-id=936 bgcolor=#d6d6d6
| 381936 ||  || — || February 10, 2010 || Kitt Peak || Spacewatch || — || align=right | 2.7 km || 
|-id=937 bgcolor=#d6d6d6
| 381937 ||  || — || February 6, 2010 || Kitt Peak || Spacewatch || — || align=right | 4.6 km || 
|-id=938 bgcolor=#d6d6d6
| 381938 ||  || — || February 14, 2010 || Haleakala || Pan-STARRS || CHA || align=right | 1.8 km || 
|-id=939 bgcolor=#E9E9E9
| 381939 ||  || — || February 14, 2010 || Haleakala || Pan-STARRS || — || align=right | 2.5 km || 
|-id=940 bgcolor=#E9E9E9
| 381940 ||  || — || February 13, 2010 || Socorro || LINEAR || HOF || align=right | 3.2 km || 
|-id=941 bgcolor=#d6d6d6
| 381941 ||  || — || January 18, 2009 || Kitt Peak || Spacewatch || — || align=right | 4.3 km || 
|-id=942 bgcolor=#E9E9E9
| 381942 ||  || — || February 3, 2010 || WISE || WISE || — || align=right | 3.1 km || 
|-id=943 bgcolor=#fefefe
| 381943 ||  || — || December 1, 2005 || Kitt Peak || Spacewatch || NYS || align=right data-sort-value="0.81" | 810 m || 
|-id=944 bgcolor=#d6d6d6
| 381944 ||  || — || April 6, 2005 || Mount Lemmon || Mount Lemmon Survey || — || align=right | 2.6 km || 
|-id=945 bgcolor=#d6d6d6
| 381945 ||  || — || February 16, 2010 || Mount Lemmon || Mount Lemmon Survey || — || align=right | 3.8 km || 
|-id=946 bgcolor=#FA8072
| 381946 ||  || — || February 19, 2010 || Siding Spring || SSS || — || align=right data-sort-value="0.77" | 770 m || 
|-id=947 bgcolor=#d6d6d6
| 381947 ||  || — || February 18, 2010 || WISE || WISE || EUP || align=right | 3.7 km || 
|-id=948 bgcolor=#d6d6d6
| 381948 ||  || — || February 18, 2010 || WISE || WISE || — || align=right | 3.5 km || 
|-id=949 bgcolor=#E9E9E9
| 381949 ||  || — || February 17, 2010 || Kitt Peak || Spacewatch || XIZ || align=right | 1.3 km || 
|-id=950 bgcolor=#d6d6d6
| 381950 ||  || — || February 23, 2010 || WISE || WISE || — || align=right | 3.9 km || 
|-id=951 bgcolor=#E9E9E9
| 381951 ||  || — || February 16, 2010 || Catalina || CSS || INO || align=right | 2.0 km || 
|-id=952 bgcolor=#d6d6d6
| 381952 ||  || — || November 5, 1996 || Kitt Peak || Spacewatch || — || align=right | 3.1 km || 
|-id=953 bgcolor=#E9E9E9
| 381953 ||  || — || February 13, 2010 || Catalina || CSS || — || align=right | 3.0 km || 
|-id=954 bgcolor=#E9E9E9
| 381954 ||  || — || March 12, 2010 || Catalina || CSS || — || align=right | 1.7 km || 
|-id=955 bgcolor=#d6d6d6
| 381955 ||  || — || December 19, 2009 || Kitt Peak || Spacewatch || — || align=right | 2.9 km || 
|-id=956 bgcolor=#d6d6d6
| 381956 ||  || — || September 12, 2007 || Mount Lemmon || Mount Lemmon Survey || TRE || align=right | 2.4 km || 
|-id=957 bgcolor=#d6d6d6
| 381957 ||  || — || March 12, 2010 || Kitt Peak || Spacewatch || — || align=right | 3.6 km || 
|-id=958 bgcolor=#d6d6d6
| 381958 ||  || — || March 12, 2010 || Kitt Peak || Spacewatch || — || align=right | 3.0 km || 
|-id=959 bgcolor=#d6d6d6
| 381959 ||  || — || March 13, 2010 || Mount Lemmon || Mount Lemmon Survey || THM || align=right | 1.9 km || 
|-id=960 bgcolor=#FA8072
| 381960 ||  || — || September 26, 2000 || Socorro || LINEAR || — || align=right | 1.8 km || 
|-id=961 bgcolor=#d6d6d6
| 381961 ||  || — || March 14, 2010 || Mount Lemmon || Mount Lemmon Survey || — || align=right | 2.7 km || 
|-id=962 bgcolor=#d6d6d6
| 381962 ||  || — || March 14, 2010 || Mount Lemmon || Mount Lemmon Survey || — || align=right | 4.4 km || 
|-id=963 bgcolor=#d6d6d6
| 381963 ||  || — || March 15, 2010 || Kitt Peak || Spacewatch || EOS || align=right | 2.1 km || 
|-id=964 bgcolor=#d6d6d6
| 381964 ||  || — || June 13, 2005 || Junk Bond || D. Healy || HYG || align=right | 3.3 km || 
|-id=965 bgcolor=#d6d6d6
| 381965 ||  || — || March 4, 2010 || Kitt Peak || Spacewatch || — || align=right | 3.7 km || 
|-id=966 bgcolor=#d6d6d6
| 381966 ||  || — || September 10, 2007 || Kitt Peak || Spacewatch || — || align=right | 3.4 km || 
|-id=967 bgcolor=#d6d6d6
| 381967 ||  || — || March 12, 2010 || Mount Lemmon || Mount Lemmon Survey || — || align=right | 2.4 km || 
|-id=968 bgcolor=#E9E9E9
| 381968 ||  || — || March 13, 2010 || Catalina || CSS || JUN || align=right | 1.2 km || 
|-id=969 bgcolor=#d6d6d6
| 381969 ||  || — || April 2, 2005 || Mount Lemmon || Mount Lemmon Survey || THM || align=right | 2.7 km || 
|-id=970 bgcolor=#d6d6d6
| 381970 ||  || — || March 15, 2010 || Kitt Peak || Spacewatch || HYG || align=right | 4.0 km || 
|-id=971 bgcolor=#E9E9E9
| 381971 ||  || — || March 7, 2010 || WISE || WISE || — || align=right | 1.7 km || 
|-id=972 bgcolor=#d6d6d6
| 381972 ||  || — || April 14, 2005 || Kitt Peak || Spacewatch || EOS || align=right | 2.6 km || 
|-id=973 bgcolor=#d6d6d6
| 381973 ||  || — || October 30, 2008 || Catalina || CSS || BRA || align=right | 1.9 km || 
|-id=974 bgcolor=#d6d6d6
| 381974 ||  || — || March 18, 2010 || Mount Lemmon || Mount Lemmon Survey || — || align=right | 4.4 km || 
|-id=975 bgcolor=#d6d6d6
| 381975 ||  || — || March 26, 2010 || Kitt Peak || Spacewatch || — || align=right | 3.4 km || 
|-id=976 bgcolor=#d6d6d6
| 381976 ||  || — || March 25, 2010 || Mount Lemmon || Mount Lemmon Survey || ARM || align=right | 3.7 km || 
|-id=977 bgcolor=#E9E9E9
| 381977 ||  || — || October 3, 2008 || Kitt Peak || Spacewatch || — || align=right | 2.1 km || 
|-id=978 bgcolor=#d6d6d6
| 381978 ||  || — || April 7, 2005 || Kitt Peak || Spacewatch || — || align=right | 2.6 km || 
|-id=979 bgcolor=#E9E9E9
| 381979 ||  || — || April 8, 2010 || WISE || WISE || — || align=right | 3.2 km || 
|-id=980 bgcolor=#d6d6d6
| 381980 ||  || — || April 8, 2010 || Siding Spring || SSS || — || align=right | 5.9 km || 
|-id=981 bgcolor=#d6d6d6
| 381981 ||  || — || April 6, 2010 || Mount Lemmon || Mount Lemmon Survey || HYG || align=right | 3.3 km || 
|-id=982 bgcolor=#d6d6d6
| 381982 ||  || — || April 4, 2010 || Kitt Peak || Spacewatch || — || align=right | 2.7 km || 
|-id=983 bgcolor=#E9E9E9
| 381983 ||  || — || April 10, 2010 || Catalina || CSS || — || align=right | 3.1 km || 
|-id=984 bgcolor=#E9E9E9
| 381984 ||  || — || January 16, 2005 || Kitt Peak || Spacewatch || — || align=right | 2.6 km || 
|-id=985 bgcolor=#d6d6d6
| 381985 ||  || — || November 24, 2003 || Kitt Peak || Spacewatch || EOS || align=right | 2.5 km || 
|-id=986 bgcolor=#d6d6d6
| 381986 ||  || — || January 30, 2010 || WISE || WISE || URS || align=right | 4.6 km || 
|-id=987 bgcolor=#C2FFFF
| 381987 ||  || — || May 29, 2008 || Kitt Peak || Spacewatch || L5ENM || align=right | 11 km || 
|-id=988 bgcolor=#d6d6d6
| 381988 ||  || — || April 20, 2010 || Kitt Peak || Spacewatch || ALA || align=right | 4.3 km || 
|-id=989 bgcolor=#FFC2E0
| 381989 ||  || — || April 28, 2010 || WISE || WISE || APO || align=right data-sort-value="0.78" | 780 m || 
|-id=990 bgcolor=#E9E9E9
| 381990 ||  || — || April 30, 2010 || WISE || WISE || — || align=right | 3.4 km || 
|-id=991 bgcolor=#d6d6d6
| 381991 ||  || — || May 8, 2010 || Mount Lemmon || Mount Lemmon Survey || EMA || align=right | 3.9 km || 
|-id=992 bgcolor=#d6d6d6
| 381992 ||  || — || January 30, 2004 || Socorro || LINEAR || — || align=right | 4.4 km || 
|-id=993 bgcolor=#E9E9E9
| 381993 ||  || — || May 19, 2010 || WISE || WISE || — || align=right | 2.4 km || 
|-id=994 bgcolor=#d6d6d6
| 381994 ||  || — || December 31, 2008 || Mount Lemmon || Mount Lemmon Survey || — || align=right | 3.7 km || 
|-id=995 bgcolor=#d6d6d6
| 381995 ||  || — || November 15, 2007 || Mount Lemmon || Mount Lemmon Survey || VER || align=right | 3.9 km || 
|-id=996 bgcolor=#E9E9E9
| 381996 ||  || — || October 2, 2003 || Kitt Peak || Spacewatch || MRX || align=right | 1.4 km || 
|-id=997 bgcolor=#d6d6d6
| 381997 ||  || — || February 7, 1999 || Kitt Peak || Spacewatch || — || align=right | 2.9 km || 
|-id=998 bgcolor=#d6d6d6
| 381998 ||  || — || June 13, 2010 || Kitt Peak || Spacewatch || — || align=right | 4.3 km || 
|-id=999 bgcolor=#E9E9E9
| 381999 ||  || — || June 14, 2010 || WISE || WISE || — || align=right | 3.0 km || 
|-id=000 bgcolor=#d6d6d6
| 382000 ||  || — || January 15, 2009 || Socorro || LINEAR || — || align=right | 4.3 km || 
|}

References

External links 
 Discovery Circumstances: Numbered Minor Planets (380001)–(385000) (IAU Minor Planet Center)

0381